= List of concurrent and parallel programming languages =

This article lists concurrent and parallel programming languages, categorizing them by a defining paradigm. Concurrent and parallel programming languages involve multiple timelines. Such languages provide synchronization constructs whose behavior is defined by a parallel execution model. A concurrent programming language is defined as one which uses the concept of simultaneously executing processes or threads of execution as a means of structuring a program. A parallel language is able to express programs that are executable on more than one processor. Both types are listed, as concurrency is a useful tool in expressing parallelism, but it is not necessary. In both cases, the features must be part of the language syntax and not an extension such as a library (libraries such as the posix-thread library implement a parallel execution model but lack the syntax and grammar required to be a programming language).

The following categories aim to capture the main, defining feature of the languages contained, but they are not necessarily orthogonal.

== Coordination languages ==
- CnC (Concurrent Collections)
- Glenda
- Linda coordination language
- Millipede

== Dataflow programming ==
- Binary Modular Dataflow Machine (BMDFM)
- CAL
- E – and object-oriented
- Joule – and distributed
- LabVIEW – and synchronous, object-oriented
- Lustre – and synchronous
- Preesm – and synchronous
- SIGNAL – and synchronous
- SISAL

== Distributed computing ==
- Bloom
- Emerald
- Hermes
- Julia
- Limbo
- MPD
- Oz - Multi-paradigm language with particular support for constraint and distributed programming.
- Sequoia
- SR

== Event-driven and hardware description ==
- Esterel (also synchronous)
- SystemC
- SystemVerilog
- Verilog
- Verilog-AMS - math modeling of continuous time systems
- VHDL

== Functional programming ==
- Clojure
- Concurrent ML
- Elixir
- Elm
- Erlang
- Futhark
- Gleam
- Haskell
- Id
- MultiLisp
- SequenceL

== Logic programming ==
- Constraint Handling Rules
- Parlog
- Mercury

== Monitor-based ==
- Concurrent Pascal
- Concurrent Euclid
- Emerald

== Multi-threaded ==
- C=
- Cilk
- Cilk Plus
- Cind
- C#
- Clojure
- Concurrent Pascal
- Delphi
- Emerald
- Fork – programming language for the PRAM model.
- Go
- Java
- LabVIEW
- ParaSail
- Python
- Rust
- SequenceL

== Object-oriented programming ==
- Ada
- C*
- C++
- C#
- JavaScript
- TypeScript
- C++ AMP
- Charm++
- Cind
- D
- Delphi
- Eiffel Simple Concurrent Object-Oriented Programming (SCOOP)
- Emerald
- Fortran – from ISO Fortran 2003 standard
- GDScript
- Java
- Join Java – has features from join-calculus
- LabVIEW
- ParaSail
- Python
- Ruby

== Partitioned global address space (PGAS) ==
- Chapel
- Coarray Fortran (included in standard/ISO Fortran since Fortran 2008, further extensions were added with the Fortran 2018 standard)
- Fortress
- High Performance Fortran
- Titanium
- Unified Parallel C
- X10
- ZPL

== Message passing ==
- Ateji PX - An extension of Java with parallel primitives inspired from pi-calculus.
- Rust
- Smalltalk

=== Actor model ===
- Axum - a domain-specific language being developed by Microsoft.
- Dart - using Isolates
- Elixir (runs on BEAM, the Erlang virtual machine)
- Erlang
- Pony
- Janus
- Red
- SALSA
- Scala/Akka (toolkit)
- Smalltalk
- Akka.NET
- LabVIEW - LabVIEW Actor Framework

=== CSP-based ===
- Alef
- Crystal
- Ease
- FortranM
- Go
- JCSP
- JoCaml
- Joyce
- Limbo (also distributed)
- Newsqueak
- Occam
- Occam-π – a derivative of Occam that integrates features from the pi-calculus
- PyCSP
- SuperPascal
- XC – a C-based language, integrating features from Occam, developed by XMOS

== APIs/frameworks ==
These application programming interfaces support parallelism in host languages.

- Apache Beam
- Apache Flink
- Apache Hadoop
- Apache Spark
- CUDA
- OpenCL
- OpenHMPP
- OpenMP for C, C++, and Fortran (shared memory and attached GPUs)
- Message Passing Interface for C, C++, and Fortran (distributed computing)
- SYCL

== See also ==
- Concurrent computing
- List of concurrent programming languages
- Parallel programming model
