= MPD =

MPD may refer to:

== Police ==
=== U.S. police ===
- Maui Police Department, Maui, Hawaii
- Memphis Police Department, Memphis, Tennessee
- Metropolitan Police Department of the District of Columbia, Washington, District of Columbia
- Miami Police Department, Miami, Florida
- Milwaukee Police Department, Milwaukee, Wisconsin
- Minneapolis Police Department, Minneapolis, Minnesota

=== Other police ===
- Manila Police District, Manila, the Philippines
- Metropolitan Police District, the area policed by the Metropolitan Police Service in London, United Kingdom
- Montreal Police Department, Montreal, Canada
- Tokyo Metropolitan Police Department, Tokyo, Japan

== Politics ==
- Movement for Democracy (Cape Verde), a political party in Cape Verde
- Movimiento Popular Democrático, a political party in Ecuador

== Science ==
- Magnetoplasmadynamic thruster, an electric space propulsion engine
- Mesoscale precipitation discussion, a short-term meteorological forecast issued by the Weather Prediction Center concerning heavy precipitation and flash flooding
- Minor-planet designation, a number–name combination given to a minor planet
- Multivariate Pólya distribution, a statistical distribution
- Mouse Phenome Database, an online database of laboratory mouse characterizations

=== Chemistry ===
- 2-Methyl-2,4-pentanediol
- m-Phenylenediamine
- Methylphenidate

=== Medicine ===
- Multiple Personality Disorder, the previous name for dissociative identity disorder
- Myeloproliferative disease, a group of diseases of the bone marrow
- Maximum permissible dose, of radiation

== Software ==
- MPD (programming language), a concurrent programming language
- Music Player Daemon, a music-player server
- Media Presentation Description, segment information in the streaming technique Dynamic Adaptive Streaming over HTTP (DASH)

== Technology ==
- Managed Pressure Drilling, an adaptive oil drilling process
- Memory Protection Devices, a company that manufactures battery holders
- A range of MIDI pad controllers made by Akai Professional

== Transportation ==
- Moonee Ponds railway station, Melbourne
- Motive power depot, a location used to store locomotives
- UTA MPD, a type of diesel multiple unit railcar of Northern Ireland Railways
- Air Comet, by ICAO airline designator

== Other uses ==
- Markovian Parallax Denigrate, a 1996 internet mystery
- Metres above principal datum (mPD), a surveying term; see sea level
