= Set theoretic programming =

Set theoretic programming is a programming paradigm based on mathematical set theory. One example of a programming language based on this paradigm is SETL. The goal of set theoretic programming is to improve programmer speed and productivity significantly, and also enhance program clarity and readability.

== Languages With Set-Based Operators ==
- Bandicoot
- Claire
- LINQ - Extensions to .NET languages such as C#, F#, and VB.NET
- Matlab
- Miranda
- SQL
- SETL
