= Alice (programming language) =

Programming language

- Paradigms: Multi-paradigm: imperative, functional, distributed, concurrent, constraint
- Family: ML: Standard ML
- Developer: Saarland University
- First appeared: June 16, 2000; 25 years ago
- Stable release: 1.4 / May 3, 2007; 18 years ago
- Typing discipline: strong, static, inferred
- OS: Cross-platform
- License: MIT
- Website: www.ps.uni-saarland.de/alice

Influenced by
- ML, Oz

Alice ML is a general-purpose, high-level, multi-paradigm, functional programming language designed by the Programming Systems Laboratory at Saarland University, Saarbrücken, Germany. It is a dialect of Standard ML, augmented with support for lazy evaluation, concurrency (multithreading and distributed computing via remote procedure calls) and constraint programming.

== Overview ==
Alice extends Standard ML in a number of ways that distinguish it from its predecessor. Alice provides concurrency features as part of the base language through the use of a future type that represents a value being provided by an independent thread of execution. A thread that uses a future value will block on an attempt to access the value until the thread performing it has completed the computation. A related concept is also provided termed a promise, allowing a thread to provide a future value that it will compute to another thread. Future and promise typed variables are used to implement data-flow synchronizing.

Like the Haskell functional language, Alice provides facilities to allow a lazy evaluation strategy in programs, unlike the traditional eager evaluation strategy of Standard ML. While Haskell uses the lazy model by default, Alice uses an eager evaluation model by default, needing an explicit programming statement for a computation to evaluate lazily.

The Alice implementation from Saarland University uses the Simple Extensible Abstract Machine (SEAM) virtual machine. It is free software, and features just-in-time compilation to bytecode and native code for the x86 architecture.

Early versions of Alice ran on the Mozart Programming System (Oz) virtual machine (VM), allowing interfacing between Alice and Oz code.

Alice's remote procedure calling depends on the virtual machine, because it may send code to be computed from one computer to another.

== Example ==
Alice extends Standard ML with several primitives for lazy evaluation and concurrency. For example, threads may be created using the spawn keyword. Consider the naive algorithm for computing the Fibonacci numbers:

 fun fib 0 = 0
   | fib 1 = 1
   | fib n = fib(n-1) + fib(n-2);

For large values of n, fib n will take a long time to compute. This computation can be performed in a separate thread by

 val x = spawn fib n;

The variable x is now bound to a so-called future. When an operation requires the value of x, it blocks until the thread is done with the computation. To exploit parallelism one could even define fib as follows:

 fun fib 0 = 0
   | fib 1 = 1
   | fib n = spawn fib(n-1) + fib(n-2);

== See also ==
- Oz (programming language)
