= Transterpreter =

Virtual machine for the language occam-pi

- Operating system: Linux, macOS, Windows, MS-DOS
- Platform: Lego Mindstorms RCX, Arduino, IA-32, SPARC, MIPS, Cell BE
- Available in: English
- Type: Virtual machine
- License: Open source
- Website: www.transterpreter.org

The transterpreter (from the words interpreter and transputer) is a virtual machine for the programming language occam-π (occam-pi), and a portable runtime for the KRoC compiler. It is designed for education and research in concurrency and robotics. The transterpreter was developed at the University of Kent.

The transterpeter has made it possible to easily run occam-π programs on platforms such as the Lego Mindstorms RCX, Arduino, IA-32, SPARC, MIPS, and the Cell BE, on the Linux, macOS, Windows, and MS-DOS operating systems.

== See also ==
- KRoC
