= David May (computer scientist) =

British computer scientist (born 1951)

Professor David May FRS FREng
- Education: University of Cambridge
- Known for: Parallel computing Processor design Transputer; Occam; Formal Methods
- Awards: FRS (1991); FREng (2010); Patterson Medal (1992)
- Scientific career
- Workplaces: University of Bristol
- Website: www.cs.bris.ac.uk/~dave/

Michael David May (born 1951) is a British computer scientist working primarily in the fields of computer architecture, parallel computing and robotics. He is a Professor in the Department of Computer Science at the University of Bristol and founder of XMOS Semiconductor, serving until February 2014 as the chief technology officer.

May was lead architect of the transputer, the first microprocessor designed for parallel and distributed computing.

He is one of the few individuals who have led the design of a CPU architecture, an interconnect and a modern era programming language.

He pioneered the industrial application of formal methods in microprocessor design, and is particularly well known for his work on memory management and compiler development.

As of 2026, May holds 54 patents in areas including microprocessors, multi-processing and communication protocols.

He is a Fellow of the Royal Society and the Royal Academy of Engineering.

== Early life and education ==
May was born in Holmfirth, Yorkshire, England and attended Queen Elizabeth Grammar School, Wakefield. From 1969 to 1972, he was a student at King's College, Cambridge, University of Cambridge, at first studying Mathematics and then Computer Science in the University of Cambridge Mathematical Laboratory, now the University of Cambridge Computer Laboratory.

At Cambridge, May learned computer architecture design from David Wheeler, who worked on EDSAC and pioneered the use of subroutines. He learned compiler writing from Martin Richards, who developed BCPL, the programming language that laid down the foundations for C (programming language).

== Career and research ==
=== Academic ===
May moved to the University of Warwick and started research in robotics. The challenges of implementing sensing and control systems led him to design and implement an early concurrent programming language, EPL, which ran on a cluster of single-board microcomputers connected by serial communication links. This early work brought him into contact with his long-term collaborator, the influential computer scientist Tony Hoare, and Iann Barron, one of the founders of Inmos.

In 1995, May became Head of the Computer Science Department at the University of Bristol. He introduced new degree programmes that included entrepreneurial activity, leading to multiple student start-ups, and he was influential in setting up the Bristol Robotics Laboratory. He held the Head of Department post until 2005, when he became co-founder and CTO of a new semiconductor company XMOS.

He is a professor at Bristol, working in the areas of computer architecture and programming languages, particularly with applications to robotics, internet of things and edge computing.

=== Semiconductor industry and entrepreneurship ===
==== Inmos ====
Inmos was formed in 1978 with a £50m investment from the UK government. May joined to work on microcomputer architecture, becoming lead architect of the transputer: the first microprocessor designed for parallel and distributed computing.

The transputer has been used primarily for massively parallel supercomputing, digital image processing, scientific computing (particularly high energy physics), robotics, as well as military applications. The transputer processor has been used in over 1 billion units worldwide.

Alongside the transputer, May designed the associated programming language Occam. This extended his earlier work and was also influenced by Tony Hoare, who was at the time working on CSP and acting as a consultant to Inmos. Occam can be used as a hardware specification language.

Working with Tony Hoare and the Programming Research Group at Oxford University, May introduced formal verification techniques into the design of the T800 floating point unit and the T9000 transputer. These were some of the earliest uses of formal verification in microprocessor design, involving specifications, correctness preserving transformations and model checking, giving rise to the initial version of the FDR checker developed at Oxford.

May initiated the design of one of the first VLSI packet switches, the C104, together with the communications system of the T9000 transputer.

May's work is particularly influential in communication and networking. For example, the standard IEEE 1355 derives from the transputer's network interface and underpins SpaceWire, a spacecraft communication network used by NASA, ESA, and many others, with applications including the James Webb Space Telescope (JWST).

Inmos was acquired by Thorn EMI and then STMicroelectronics, which has become the largest semiconductor company in Europe.

==== XMOS Semiconductor ====
In 2005, May co-founded XMOS - a fabless semiconductor company that makes software-defined, customisable silicon for applications in the consumer, industrial and automotive sectors - with Ali Dixon, James Foster, Noel Hurley, and Hitesh MehtaS. It has raised over $60m with investors including Amadeus Capital Partners, Robert Bosch Venture Capital GmbH, Huawei Technologies, Xilinx Inc, Harbert European Growth Capital and Infineon.

May was CTO until 2014 and is on the advisory board.

==== Expert and advisory work ====
May has been involved in a number of additional semiconductor companies; for example:

- Advisor to Icera, acquired by NVidia.
- Advisor to UltraSoC, acquired by Siemens.
- Advisor to Element-14, acquired by Broadcom
- He wrote the original instruction set for Picochip (acquired by Mindspeed Technologies, Inc and subsequently by Intel).

May also acts as an expert witness in intellectual property litigation.

== May's law ==
May's Law states, in reference to Moore's Law:

Software efficiency halves every 18 months, compensating Moore's Law.

== Awards and honours ==
=== Royal Fellowships ===
May is a Fellow of The Royal Society, elected in 1991, for his contributions to computer architecture and parallel computing.

He is also a Fellow of the Royal Academy of Engineering, elected in 2010.

=== Prizes and honours ===
May received an Honorary DSc from the University of Southampton in 1990.

He was awarded the Clifford Paterson Medal and Prize of the Institute of Physics in 1992, for contributions to the application of physics in an industrial or commercial context.

== Personal life ==
May is married with 3 sons and 5 grandchildren, his eldest being Luca Michelotti.
