= Caja project =

Google project for sanitizing third party HTML, CSS and JavaScript

Caja (pronounced /ˈkɑːhɑː/ KAH-hah) was a Google project for sanitizing third party HTML, CSS, and JavaScript. On January 31, 2021, Google archived the project due to known vulnerabilities and lack of maintenance to keep up with the latest web security research, recommending instead the Closure toolkit.

The Caja project was led by Jasvir Nagra with the JavaScript portion designed by Google research scientist Mark S. Miller in 2008 as a JavaScript implementation for "virtual iframes" based on the principles of object-capabilities. It would take JavaScript (technically, ECMAScript 5 strict mode code), HTML, and CSS input and rewrite it into a safe subset of HTML and CSS, plus a single JavaScript function with no free variables. That means the only way such a function could modify an object, was if it was given a reference to the object by the host page. Instead of giving direct references to DOM objects, the host page typically gives references to wrappers that sanitize HTML, proxy URLs, and prevent redirecting the page; this allowed Caja to prevent certain phishing and cross-site scripting attacks, and prevent downloading malware. Also, since all rewritten programs ran in the same frame, the host page could allow one program to export an object reference to another program; then inter-frame communication was simply method invocation.

The word "caja" is Spanish for "box" or "safe" (as in a bank), the idea being that Caja could safely contain JavaScript programs as well as being a capabilities-based JavaScript.

Caja was used by Google in its Google Apps Script products. In 2008 MySpace and Yahoo! had both deployed a very early version of Caja.

== See also ==
- Joe-E, an object-capability subset of Java
- E
