= Concepts, Techniques, and Models of Computer Programming =

2004 textbook by Peter Van Roy and Seif Haridi

- First edition cover, showing Sagrada Família in Barcelona
- Author: Peter Van Roy, Seif Haridi
- Language: English
- Subject: Computer science
- Publisher: MIT Press
- Publication date: March 2004
- Media type: Print (Hardcover)
- Pages: 900
- ISBN: 0-262-22069-5

Concepts, Techniques, and Models of Computer Programming is a textbook published in 2004 about general computer programming concepts from MIT Press written by Université catholique de Louvain professor Peter Van Roy and Royal Institute of Technology, Sweden professor Seif Haridi.

Using a carefully selected progression of subsets of the Oz programming language, the book explains the most important programming concepts, techniques, and models (paradigms).

Translations of this book have been published in French (by Dunod Éditeur, 2007), Japanese (by Shoeisha, 2007) and Polish (by Helion, 2005).
