= Oz (programming language) =

Multiparadigm programming language

- Paradigm: multi-paradigm: logic, functional, imperative, object-oriented, constraint, distributed, concurrent
- Designed by: Gert Smolka, his students
- Developer: Mozart Consortium
- First appeared: 1991; 35 years ago
- Stable release: Oz 1.4.0 (final), Mozart 2.0.1 / 5 September 2018; 7 years ago
- Typing discipline: dynamic
- License: MIT X11
- Website: mozart2.org

Major implementations
- Mozart Programming System

Dialects
- Oz, Mozart

Influenced by
- Erlang, Lisp, Prolog

Influenced
- Alice, Scala

Oz is a multiparadigm programming language, developed in the Programming Systems Lab at Université catholique de Louvain, for programming-language education. It has a canonical textbook: Concepts, Techniques, and Models of Computer Programming.

Oz was first designed by Gert Smolka and his students in 1991. In 1996, development of Oz continued in cooperation with the research group of Seif Haridi and Peter Van Roy at the Swedish Institute of Computer Science. Since 1999, Oz has been continually developed by an international group, the Mozart Consortium, which originally consisted of Saarland University, the Swedish Institute of Computer Science, and the Université catholique de Louvain. In 2005, the responsibility for managing Mozart development was transferred to a core group, the Mozart Board, with the express purpose of opening Mozart development to a larger community.

The Mozart Programming System is the primary implementation of Oz. It is released with an open source license by the Mozart Consortium. Mozart has been ported to Unix, FreeBSD, Linux, Windows, and macOS.

== Language features ==
Oz contains most of the concepts of the major programming paradigms, including logic, functional (both lazy evaluation and eager evaluation), imperative, object-oriented, constraint, distributed, and concurrent programming. Oz has both a simple formal semantics (see chapter 13 of the book mentioned below) and an efficient implementation. Oz is a concurrency-oriented language, as the term was introduced by Joe Armstrong, the main designer of the Erlang language. A concurrency-oriented language makes concurrency easy to use and efficient. Oz supports a canonical graphical user interface (GUI) language QTk.

In addition to multi-paradigm programming, the major strengths of Oz are in constraint programming and distributed programming. Due to its factored design, Oz is able to successfully implement a network-transparent distributed programming model. This model makes it easy to program open, fault-tolerant applications within the language. For constraint programming, Oz introduces the idea of computation spaces, which allow user-defined search and distribution strategies orthogonal to the constraint domain.

== Language overview ==
=== Data structures ===
Oz is based on a core language with very few datatypes that can be extended into more practical ones through syntactic sugar.

Basic data structures:

- Numbers: floating point or integer (real integer)
- Records: for grouping data : circle(x:0 y:1 radius:3 color:blue style:dots). Here the terms x,y, radius etc. are called features and the data associated with the features (in this case 0,1,3 etc.) are the values.
- Tuples: Records with integer features in ascending order: circle(1:0 2:1 3:3 4:blue 5:dots) .
- Lists: a simple linear structure

'|'(2 '|'(4 '|'(6 '|'(8 nil)))) % as a record.
2|(4|(6|(8|nil))) % with some syntactic sugar
2|4|6|8|nil % more syntactic sugar
[2 4 6 8] % even more syntactic sugar

Those data structures are values (constant), first class and dynamically type checked. Variable names in Oz start with an uppercase letter to distinguish them from literals which always begin with a lowercase letter.

=== Functions ===
Functions are first class values, allowing higher order functional programming:

fun {Fact N}
   if N =< 0 then 1 else N*{Fact N-1} end
end

fun {Comb N K}
   {Fact N} div ({Fact K} * {Fact N-K}) % integers can't overflow in Oz (unless no memory is left)
end

fun {SumList List}
   case List of nil then 0
   [] H|T then H+{SumList T} % pattern matching on lists
   end
end

Functions may be used with both free and bound variables. Free variable values are found using static lexical scoping.

==== Higher-order programming ====
Functions are like other Oz objects. A function can be passed as an attribute to other functions or can be returned in a function.

fun {Square N}  % A general function
   N*N
end

fun {Map F Xs}  % F is a function here - higher order programming
   case Xs
      of nil then nil
      [] X|Xr then {F X}|{Map F Xr}
   end
end

%usage
{Browse {Map Square [1 2 3]}}  %browses [1 4 9]

==== Anonymous functions ====
Like many other functional languages, Oz supports use of anonymous functions (i.e. functions which do not have a name) with higher order programming. The symbol $ is used to denote these.

In the following, the square function is defined anonymously and passed, causing [1 4 9] to be browsed.

{Browse {Map fun {$ N} N*N end [1 2 3]}}

Since anonymous functions don't have names, it is not possible to define recursive anonymous functions.

==== Procedures ====
Functions in Oz are supposed to return a value at the last statement encountered in the body of the function during its execution. In the example below, the function Ret returns 5 if X > 0 and -5 otherwise.

declare
fun {Ret X}
   if X > 0 then 5 else ~5 end
end

But Oz also provides a facility in case a function must not return values. Such functions are called procedures. Procedures are defined using the construct "proc" as follows

declare
proc {Ret X}
   if X > 0 then {Browse 5} else {Browse ~5} end
end

The above example doesn't return any value, it just prints 5 or -5 in the Oz browser depending on the sign of X.

=== Dataflow variables and declarative concurrency ===
When the program encounters an unbound variable it waits for a value. For example, below, the thread will wait until both X and Y are bound to a value before showing the value of Z.

thread 
   Z = X+Y
   {Browse Z}
end
thread X = 40 end
thread Y = 2 end

The value of a dataflow variable cannot be changed once it is bound:

X = 1
X = 2 % error

Dataflow variables make it easy to create concurrent stream agents:

fun {Ints N Max}
   if N == Max then nil
   else 
      {Delay 1000}
      N|{Ints N+1 Max}
   end
end

fun {Sum S Stream}
   case Stream
      of nil then S
      [] H|T then S|{Sum H+S T}
   end
end

local X Y in
   thread X = {Ints 0 1000} end
   thread Y = {Sum 0 X} end
   {Browse Y}
end

Because of the way dataflow variables work, it is possible to put threads anywhere in a program and guaranteed that it will have the same result. This makes concurrent programming very easy. Threads are very cheap: it is possible to have 100,000 threads running at once.

=== Example: Trial division sieve ===
This example computes a stream of prime numbers using the trial division algorithm by recursively creating concurrent stream agents that filter out non-prime numbers:

fun {Sieve Xs}
   case Xs of nil then nil
   [] X|Xr then Ys in
      thread Ys = {Filter Xr fun {$ Y} Y mod X \= 0 end} end
      X|{Sieve Ys}
   end
end

=== Laziness ===
Oz uses eager evaluation by default, but lazy evaluation is possible. Below, the fact is only computed when value of X is needed to compute the value of Y.

fun lazy {Fact N}
   if N =< 0 then 1 else N*{Fact N-1} end
end
local X Y in
  X = {Fact 100} 
  Y = X + 1
end

Lazy evaluation gives the possibility of storing truly infinite data structures in Oz. The power of lazy evaluation can be seen from the following code sample:

declare
fun lazy {Merge Xs Ys}
   case Xs#Ys
   of (X|Xr)#(Y|Yr) then
      if X < Y then X|{Merge Xr Ys}
      elseif X>Y then Y|{Merge Xs Yr}
      else X|{Merge Xr Yr}
      end
   end
end

fun lazy {Times N Xs}
   case Xs
   of nil then nil
   [] X|Xr then N*X|{Times N Xr}
   end
end

declare H
H = 1 | {Merge {Times 2 H} {Merge {Times 3 H} {Times 5 H}}}
{Browse {List.take H 6}}

The code above elegantly computes all the Regular Numbers in an infinite list. The actual numbers are computed only when they are needed.

=== Message passing concurrency ===
The declarative concurrent model can be extended with message passing via simple semantics:

declare
local Stream Port in
   Port = {NewPort Stream}
   {Send Port 1} % Stream is now 1|_ ('_' indicates an unbound and unnamed variable)
   {Send Port 2} % Stream is now 1|2|_ 
   ...
   {Send Port n} % Stream is now 1|2| .. |n|_
end

With a port and a thread, asynchronous agents can be defined:

fun {NewAgent Init Fun}
   Msg Out in
   thread {FoldL Msg Fun Init Out} end
   {NewPort Msg}
end

=== State and objects ===
It is again possible to extend the declarative model to support state and object-oriented programming with very simple semantics. To create a new mutable data structure called Cells:

local A X in
   A = {NewCell 0}
   A := 1  % changes the value of A to 1
   X = @A  % @ is used to access the value of A
end

With these simple semantic changes, the whole object-oriented paradigm can be supported. With a little syntactic sugar, OOP becomes well integrated in Oz.

class Counter
   attr val
   meth init(Value)
      val:=Value
   end
   meth browse
      {Browse @val}
   end
   meth inc(Value)
      val :=@val+Value
   end
end

local C in
   C = {New Counter init(0)}
   {C inc(6)}
   {C browse}
end

== Execution speed ==
The execution speed of a program produced by the Mozart compiler (version 1.4.0 implementing Oz 3) is very slow. On a 2012 set of benchmarks it averaged about 50 times slower than that of the GNU Compiler Collection (GCC) for the C language.

== See also ==
- Alice (programming language), a concurrent functional constraint language from Saarland University
- Dataflow programming
- Functional logic programming languages
  - Curry (programming language)
  - Mercury (programming language)
  - Visual Prolog, an object-oriented, functional, logic language
