= Occam-π =

Variant of the programming language occam

occam-π
- Paradigm: Imperative, procedural, concurrent
- Designed by: Fred Barnes, Peter Welch
- Developers: occam for all, University of Kent
- Platform: IA-32, Arduino

Influenced by
- occam

In computer science, occam-π (or occam-pi) is the name of a variant of the programming language occam developed by the Kent Retargetable occam Compiler (KRoC) team at the University of Kent. The name reflects the introduction of elements of π-calculus (pi-calculus) into occam, especially concepts involving mobile agents (processes) and data. The language contains several extensions to occam 2.1, including:

- Nested protocols
- Run-time process creation
- Mobile channels, data, and processes
- Recursion
- Protocol inheritance
- Array constructors
- Extended rendezvous

== See also ==
- occam (programming language)
- Transputer
- KRoC
- Transterpreter
