= FortranM =

Computer language for modular parallel programming

FortranM is a computer language for modular parallel programming. Its syntax is based on Fortran but has additional elements such as channels and ports for communication between processes.

The language was designed by K. Mani Chandy's group at Caltech, along with an Argonne national labs team. The compiler for the language is freely available from Argonne labs.

In FortranM processes communicate by sending and receiving messages on channels. Processes and channels can be dynamically created, but programs remain deterministic.
