= Deductive language =

A deductive language is a computer programming language in which the program is a collection of predicates ('facts') and rules that connect them. Such a language is used to create knowledge based systems or expert systems which can deduce answers to problem sets by applying the rules to the facts they have been given. An example of a deductive language is Prolog, or its database-query cousin, Datalog.

== History ==
As the name implies, deductive languages are rooted in the principles of deductive reasoning; making inferences based upon current knowledge. The first recommendation to use a clausal form of logic for representing computer programs was made by Cordell Green (1969) at Stanford Research Institute (now SRI International). This idea can also be linked back to the battle between procedural and declarative information representation in early artificial intelligence systems. Deductive languages and their use in logic programming can also be dated to the same year when Foster and Elcock introduced Absys, the first deductive/logical programming language. Shortly after, the first Prolog system was introduced in 1972 by Colmerauer through collaboration with Robert Kowalski.

== Components ==
The components of a deductive language are a system of formal logic and a knowledge base upon which the logic is applied.

=== Formal Logic ===
Formal logic is the study of inference in regards to formal content. The distinguishing feature between formal and informal logic is that in the former case, the logical rule applied to the content is not specific to a situation. The laws hold regardless of a change in context. Although first-order logic is described in the example below to demonstrate the uses of a deductive language, no formal system is mandated and the use of a specific system is defined within the language rules or grammar.

As input, a predicate takes any object(s) in the domain of interest and outputs either one of two Boolean values: true or false. For example, consider the sentences "Barack Obama is the 44th president" and "If it rains today, I will bring an umbrella". The first is a statement with an associated truth value. The second is a conditional statement relying on the value of some other statement. Either of these sentences can be broken down into predicates which can be compared and form the knowledge base of a deductive language.

Moreover, variables such as 'Barack Obama' or 'president' can be quantified over. For example, take 'Barack Obama' as variable 'x'. In the sentence "There exists an 'x' such that if 'x' is the president, then 'x' is the commander in chief." This is an example of the existential quantifier in first order logic. Take 'president' to be the variable 'y'. In the sentence "For every 'y', 'y' is the leader of their nation." This is an example of the universal quantifier.

=== Knowledge Base ===
A collection of 'facts' or predicates and variables form the knowledge base of a deductive language. Depending on the language, the order of declaration of these predicates within the knowledge base may or may not influence the result of applying logical rules. Upon application of certain 'rules' or inferences, new predicates may be added to a knowledge base. As new facts are established or added, they form the basis for new inferences. As the core of early expert systems, artificial intelligence systems which can make decisions like an expert human, knowledge bases provided more information than databases. They contained structured data, with classes, subclasses, and instances.

== Prolog ==
Prolog is an example of a deductive, declarative language that applies first- order logic to a knowledge base. To run a program in Prolog, a query is posed and based upon the inference engine and the specific facts in the knowledge base, a result is returned. The result can be anything appropriate from a new relation or predicate, to a literal such as a Boolean (true/false), depending on the engine and type system.
