= Mouse Phenome Database =

Online biological database

The Mouse Phenome Database (MPD) is a web-accessible database of strain characterization data for the laboratory mouse, to facilitate translational research for human health and disease. MPD characterizes phenotype as well as genotype, and provides tools for online analysis. Most phenotype data are in the form of strain surveys (comparisons of 10-40 commonly used mouse strains) and cover such areas as hematology, bone mineral density, cholesterol levels, endocrine function, and aging processes. Genotype data are primarily in the form of single-nucleotide polymorphisms. Data are contributed by participating scientists or downloaded from public resources. The MPD was begun in 2000, is funded by grants from the National Institutes of Health and other sources, and is headquartered at The Jackson Laboratory.
