= Comparison of multi-paradigm programming languages =

Programming languages can be grouped by the number and types of paradigms supported.

== Paradigm summaries ==
A concise reference for the programming paradigms listed in this article.

- Concurrent programming – have language constructs for concurrency, these may involve multi-threading, support for distributed computing, message passing, shared resources (including shared memory), or futures
  - Actor programming – concurrent computation with actors that make local decisions in response to the environment (capable of selfish or competitive behaviour)
- Constraint programming – relations between variables are expressed as constraints (or constraint networks), directing allowable solutions (uses constraint satisfaction or simplex algorithm)
- Dataflow programming – forced recalculation of formulas when data values change (e.g. spreadsheets)
- Declarative programming – describes what computation should perform, without specifying detailed state changes cf. imperative programming (functional and logic programming are major subgroups of declarative programming)
- Distributed programming – have support for multiple autonomous computers that communicate via computer networks
- Functional programming – uses evaluation of mathematical functions and avoids state and mutable data
- Generic programming – uses algorithms written in terms of to-be-specified-later types that are then instantiated as needed for specific types provided as parameters
- Imperative programming – explicit statements that change a program state
- Logic programming – uses explicit mathematical logic for programming
- Metaprogramming – writing programs that write or manipulate other programs (or themselves) as their data, or that do part of the work at compile time that would otherwise be done at runtime
  - Template metaprogramming – metaprogramming methods in which a compiler uses templates to generate temporary source code, which is merged by the compiler with the rest of the source code and then compiled
  - Reflective programming – metaprogramming methods in which a program modifies or extends itself
- Object-oriented programming – uses data structures consisting of data fields and methods together with their interactions (objects) to design programs
  - Class-based – object-oriented programming in which inheritance is achieved by defining classes of objects, versus the objects themselves
  - Prototype-based – object-oriented programming that avoids classes and implements inheritance via cloning of instances
- Pipeline programming – a simple syntax change to add syntax to nest function calls to language originally designed with none
- Rule-based programming – a network of rules of thumb that comprise a knowledge base and can be used for expert systems and problem deduction & resolution
- Visual programming – manipulating program elements graphically rather than by specifying them textually (e.g. Simulink); also termed diagrammatic programming

== Language overview ==
List of multi-paradigm programming languages
Language	Paradigm count	Concurrent	Constraints	Dataflow	Declarative	Distributed	Functional	Metaprogramming	Generic	Imperative	Logic	Reflection	Object-oriented	Pipelines	Visual	Rule-based	Other
Ada	5	Yes (Note: rendezvous and monitor-like based)	—N/a	—N/a	—N/a	Yes	—N/a	—N/a	Yes	Yes	—N/a	—N/a	Yes (Note: class-based)	—N/a	—N/a	—N/a	—N/a
ALF	2	—N/a	—N/a	—N/a	—N/a	—N/a	Yes	—N/a	—N/a	—N/a	Yes	—N/a	—N/a	—N/a	—N/a	—N/a	—N/a
AmigaE	2	—N/a	—N/a	—N/a	—N/a	—N/a	—N/a	—N/a	—N/a	Yes	—N/a	—N/a	Yes	—N/a	—N/a	—N/a	—N/a
APL	3	—N/a	—N/a	—N/a	—N/a	—N/a	Yes	—N/a	—N/a	Yes	—N/a	—N/a	—N/a	—N/a	—N/a	—N/a	Array (multi-dimensional)
BETA	3	—N/a	—N/a	—N/a	—N/a	—N/a	Yes	—N/a	—N/a	Yes	—N/a	—N/a	Yes	—N/a	—N/a	—N/a	—N/a
C++	7 (15)	Yes	Library	Library	Library	Library	Yes	Yes	Yes (Note: template metaprogramming)	Yes	Library	Library	Yes	Library	—N/a	Library	Array (multi-dimensional; using STL)
C#	8 (15)	Yes	Library	Library (Note: using TPL Dataflow)	Yes	Library	Yes (Note: only lambda support (lazy functional programming))	Yes	Yes	Yes	Library	Yes	Yes	Library (Note: using TPL Dataflow)	Library	Library	Reactive (Note: using Reactive Extensions (Rx))
ChucK	3	Yes	—N/a	—N/a	—N/a	—N/a	—N/a	—N/a	—N/a	Yes	—N/a	—N/a	Yes	—N/a	—N/a	—N/a	—N/a
Claire	2	—N/a	—N/a	—N/a	—N/a	—N/a	Yes	—N/a	—N/a	—N/a	—N/a	—N/a	Yes	—N/a	—N/a	—N/a	—N/a
Clojure	5	Yes	—N/a	—N/a	Yes	—N/a	Yes	Yes	—N/a	—N/a	Library	—N/a	—N/a	Yes	—N/a	—N/a	Multiple dispatch, Agents
Common Lisp	7 (14)	Library	Library	Library	Yes	Library	Yes	Yes	Yes	Yes	Library	Yes	Yes (Note: multiple dispatch, method combinations)	Library	Library	Library	Multiple dispatch, meta-OOP system, Language is extensible via metaprogramming.
Curl	5	—N/a	—N/a	—N/a	—N/a	—N/a	Yes	—N/a	Yes	Yes	—N/a	Yes	Yes	—N/a	—N/a	—N/a	—N/a
Curry	4	Yes	Yes	—N/a	—N/a	—N/a	Yes	—N/a	—N/a	—N/a	Yes	—N/a	—N/a	—N/a	—N/a	—N/a	—N/a
D (version 2.0)	7	Yes (Note: actor programming)	—N/a	—N/a	—N/a	—N/a	Yes	Yes	Yes	Yes	—N/a	Yes	Yes	—N/a	—N/a	—N/a	—N/a
Delphi	3	—N/a	—N/a	—N/a	—N/a	—N/a	—N/a	—N/a	Yes	Yes	—N/a	—N/a	Yes	—N/a	—N/a	—N/a	—N/a
Dylan	3	—N/a	—N/a	—N/a	—N/a	—N/a	Yes	—N/a	—N/a	—N/a	—N/a	Yes	Yes	—N/a	—N/a	—N/a	—N/a
E	3	Yes	—N/a	—N/a	—N/a	Yes	—N/a	—N/a	—N/a	—N/a	—N/a	—N/a	Yes	—N/a	—N/a	—N/a	—N/a
ECMAScript (ActionScript, E4X, JavaScript, JScript)	4 (5)	Partial (Note: promises, native extensions) (Note: using Node.js' cluster module or child_process.fork method, web workers in the browser, etc.)	—N/a	—N/a	Library	—N/a	Yes	—N/a	—N/a	Yes	—N/a	Yes	Yes (Note: Prototype-based)	Library	—N/a	—N/a	Reactive, (Note: using Reactive Extensions (RxJS)) event driven (Note: in Node.js via their events module) (Note: in browsers via their native EventTarget API)
Erlang	3	Yes	—N/a	—N/a	Yes	Yes	Yes	—N/a	—N/a	—N/a	—N/a	—N/a	—N/a	Yes	—N/a	—N/a	—N/a
Elixir	4	Yes	—N/a	—N/a	—N/a	Yes	Yes	Yes	—N/a	—N/a	—N/a	—N/a	—N/a	Yes	—N/a	—N/a	—N/a
Elm	6	Yes	—N/a	Yes	Yes	—N/a	Yes (pure) (Note: purely functional)	—N/a	Yes	—N/a	—N/a	—N/a	—N/a	Yes	—N/a	—N/a	Reactive
F#	7 (8)	Yes	—N/a	Library	Yes	—N/a	Yes	—N/a	Yes	Yes	—N/a	Yes	Yes	—N/a	—N/a	—N/a	Reactive
Fortran	4 (5)	Yes	—N/a	—N/a	—N/a	—N/a	Yes	—N/a	Yes (Note: parameterized classes)	—N/a	—N/a	—N/a	Yes	—N/a	—N/a	—N/a	Array (multi-dimensional)
Go	4	Yes	—N/a	—N/a	—N/a	—N/a	—N/a	—N/a	—N/a	Yes	—N/a	Yes	—N/a	Yes	—N/a	—N/a	—N/a
Haskell	8 (15)	Yes	Library	Library	Yes	Library	Yes (lazy) (pure)	Yes	Yes	Yes	Library	—N/a	Partial (Note: immutable)	Yes	Yes	Library	Literate, reactive, dependent types (partial)
Io	4	Yes	—N/a	—N/a	—N/a	—N/a	Yes	—N/a	—N/a	Yes	—N/a	—N/a	Yes	—N/a	—N/a	—N/a	—N/a
J	3	—N/a	—N/a	—N/a	—N/a	—N/a	Yes	—N/a	—N/a	Yes	—N/a	—N/a	Yes	—N/a	—N/a	—N/a	—N/a
Java	6	Yes	Library	Library	—N/a	—N/a	Yes	—N/a	Yes	Yes	—N/a	Yes	Yes	—N/a	—N/a	—N/a	—N/a
Julia	9 (17)	Yes	Library	Library	Library	Yes	Yes (eager)	Yes	Yes	Yes	Library	Yes	Partial (Note: Uses structs with function polymorphism and multiple dispatch)	Yes	—N/a	Library	Multiple dispatch, Array (multi-dimensional); optionally lazy and reactive (with libraries)
Kotlin	8	Yes	—N/a	—N/a	—N/a	—N/a	Yes	Yes	Yes	Yes	—N/a	Yes	Yes	Yes	—N/a	—N/a	—N/a
LabVIEW	4	Yes	—N/a	Yes	—N/a	—N/a	—N/a	—N/a	—N/a	—N/a	—N/a	—N/a	Yes	—N/a	Yes	—N/a	—N/a
Lava	2	—N/a	—N/a	—N/a	—N/a	—N/a	—N/a	—N/a	—N/a	—N/a	—N/a	—N/a	Yes	—N/a	Yes	—N/a	—N/a
LispWorks (version 6.0 with support for symmetric multi-processing, rules, logic (Prolog), CORBA)	9	Yes	—N/a	—N/a	—N/a	Yes	Yes	Yes	—N/a	Yes	Yes	Yes	Yes	—N/a	—N/a	Yes	—N/a
Lua	3	—N/a	—N/a	—N/a	—N/a	—N/a	Yes	—N/a	—N/a	Yes	—N/a	—N/a	Yes	—N/a	—N/a	—N/a	—N/a
MATLAB	6 (10)	Toolbox	Toolbox	Yes	—N/a	Toolbox	—N/a	Yes	Yes	—N/a	—N/a	Yes	Yes	—N/a	Yes	—N/a	Array (multi-dimensional)
Nemerle	7	Yes	—N/a	—N/a	—N/a	—N/a	Yes	Yes	Yes	Yes	—N/a	Yes	Yes	—N/a	—N/a	—N/a	—N/a
Object Pascal	4	Yes	—N/a	—N/a	—N/a	—N/a	Yes	—N/a	—N/a	Yes	—N/a	—N/a	Yes	—N/a	—N/a	—N/a	—N/a
OCaml	4	—N/a	—N/a	—N/a	—N/a	—N/a	Yes	—N/a	Yes	Yes	—N/a	—N/a	Yes	—N/a	—N/a	—N/a	—N/a
Oz	11	Yes	Yes	Yes	Yes	Yes	Yes	—N/a	—N/a	Yes	Yes	—N/a	Yes	Yes	—N/a	Yes	—N/a
Perl	8 (9)	Yes	—N/a	Yes	—N/a	—N/a	Yes	Yes	—N/a	Yes	—N/a	Yes	Yes	Yes	—N/a	—N/a	—N/a
PHP	4	—N/a	—N/a	—N/a	—N/a	—N/a	Yes	—N/a	—N/a	Yes	—N/a	Yes	Yes	—N/a	—N/a	—N/a	—N/a
Poplog	3	—N/a	—N/a	—N/a	—N/a	—N/a	Yes	—N/a	—N/a	Yes	Yes	—N/a	—N/a	—N/a	—N/a	—N/a	—N/a
Prograph	3	—N/a	—N/a	Yes	—N/a	—N/a	—N/a	—N/a	—N/a	—N/a	—N/a	—N/a	Yes	—N/a	Yes	—N/a	—N/a
Python	5 (10)	Library	Library	—N/a	—N/a	Library	Yes	Yes	Yes	Yes	Library	Yes	Yes	—N/a	—N/a	—N/a	Structured
R	4 (6)	Library	—N/a	—N/a	—N/a	Library	Yes	—N/a	—N/a	Yes	—N/a	Yes	Yes	Yes	—N/a	—N/a	Array (multi-dimensional)
Racket	10	Yes	Yes	Yes	—N/a	Yes	Yes	Yes	—N/a	Yes	Yes	Yes	Yes	—N/a	—N/a	—N/a	Lazy
Raku	10	Yes	Library	Yes	—N/a	Library	Yes	Yes	Yes	Yes	—N/a	Yes	Yes	Yes	—N/a	—N/a	Multiple dispatch, lazy lists, reactive.
ROOP	3	—N/a	—N/a	—N/a	—N/a	—N/a	—N/a	—N/a	—N/a	Yes	Yes	—N/a	—N/a	—N/a	—N/a	Yes	—N/a
Ruby	5	—N/a	—N/a	—N/a	—N/a	—N/a	Yes	Yes	—N/a	Yes	—N/a	Yes	Yes	—N/a	—N/a	—N/a	—N/a
Rust (version 1.0.0-alpha)	6	Yes	—N/a	—N/a	—N/a	—N/a	Yes	Yes	Yes	Yes	—N/a	—N/a	Yes	—N/a	—N/a	—N/a	Linear, affline, and ownership types
Sather	2	—N/a	—N/a	—N/a	—N/a	—N/a	Yes	—N/a	—N/a	—N/a	—N/a	—N/a	Yes	—N/a	—N/a	—N/a	—N/a
Scala	9	Yes	—N/a	Yes (Note: Akka)	Yes	—N/a	Yes	Yes	Yes	Yes	—N/a	Yes	Yes	—N/a	—N/a	—N/a	—N/a
Simula	2	—N/a	—N/a	—N/a	—N/a	—N/a	—N/a	—N/a	—N/a	Yes	—N/a	—N/a	Yes	—N/a	—N/a	—N/a	—N/a
SISAL	3	Yes	—N/a	Yes	—N/a	—N/a	Yes	—N/a	—N/a	—N/a	—N/a	—N/a	—N/a	—N/a	—N/a	—N/a	—N/a
Spreadsheets	2	—N/a	—N/a	—N/a	—N/a	—N/a	Yes	—N/a	—N/a	—N/a	—N/a	—N/a	—N/a	—N/a	Yes	—N/a	—N/a
Swift	7	Yes	—N/a	—N/a	—N/a	—N/a	Yes	Yes	Yes	Yes	—N/a	Yes	Yes	—N/a	—N/a	—N/a	Block-structured
Tcl with Snit extension	3	—N/a	—N/a	—N/a	—N/a	—N/a	Yes	—N/a	—N/a	Yes	—N/a	—N/a	Yes	—N/a	—N/a	—N/a	—N/a
Visual Basic .NET	6 (7)	Yes	—N/a	Library	—N/a	—N/a	Yes	—N/a	Yes	Yes	—N/a	Yes	Yes	—N/a	—N/a	—N/a	Reactive
Windows PowerShell	6	—N/a	—N/a	—N/a	—N/a	—N/a	Yes	—N/a	Yes	Yes	—N/a	Yes	Yes	Yes	—N/a	—N/a	—N/a
Wolfram Language & Mathematica	13 (14)	Yes	Yes	Yes	Yes	Yes	Yes	Yes	Yes	Yes	Yes	Yes	Yes	Yes	—N/a	Yes	Knowledge Based

== See also ==
- Carbon (programming language) — multi-paradigm language being developed at Google to be a successor to C++
- Programming paradigm
- List of programming languages by type
- Domain-specific language
- Domain-specific multimodeling
