= Mark S. Miller =

American computer scientist

Mark
- Other names: Mark S. Miller, Mark Samuel Miller, MarkM
- Education: BS in computer science from Yale in 1980; PhD Johns Hopkins 2006
- Alma mater: Johns Hopkins
- Known for: E (programming language), Object Capabilities, CAJA
- Scientific career
- Fields: Computer Science
- Workplaces: Agoric; Google; Xerox PARC; Hewlett-Packard Labs
- Thesis: Robust Composition: Towards a Unified Approach to Access Control and Concurrency Control (2006)
- Doctoral advisor: Jonathan Shapiro
- Website: http://erights.org

Mark S. Miller is an American computer scientist. He is known for his work as one of the participants in the 1979 hypertext project known as Project Xanadu; for inventing Miller columns; and the open-source coordinator of the E programming language. He also designed the Caja compiler. Miller is a Senior Research Fellow at the Foresight Institute.

Miller earned a BS in computer science from Yale in 1980 and published his Johns Hopkins PhD thesis in 2006. He is currently Chief Scientist at Agoric and a member of the ECMAScript (JavaScript) committee. Previous positions include Chief Architect with the Virus-Safe Computing Initiative at HP Labs, and research scientist at Google between 2007 and 2017.

Miller's research has focused on language design for secure open systems. At Xerox PARC, he worked on Concurrent Logic Programming systems and Agoric Open Systems. At Sun Labs, (while working for Agorics, an earlier company with a similar name to his current employer) he led the development of WebMart, a framework for buying and selling computing resources (network bandwidth, access to a printer, images, CD jukebox etc.) across the network. At HP Labs he was the architect for the Virus Safe Computing project. While at Google he developed Caja, an environment for secure execution of JavaScript. He has also written articles on complex adaptive systems and risk mitigation strategies for future technologies.

Miller has been pursuing a stated goal of enabling cooperation between untrusting partners. Miller sees this as a fundamental feature required to power economic interactions, and the main piece that has been missing in the toolkit available to software developers. Miller has returned to this issue repeatedly since the Agoric Open Systems Papers from 1988.

Miller's most prominent contributions have been in the area of programming language design, most notably, the E language, which demonstrated language-based secure distributed computing. The work inspired several adaptations to other programming paradigms. He was also instrumental on the ECMAScript standards committee (TC39) in providing the foundations for development of Secure EcmaScript (SES), a standards track evolution that will make full capability programming available in JavaScript.

Miller's work has been written up in Wired which described his work as the inspiration for database researcher Michael Stonebraker's Mariposa, developed at Berkeley.

== Major publications ==
- Agoric Open Systems papers With K. Eric Drexler. Presented a paradigm of using market mechanisms to manage the use of resources in computing systems
- Language Design and Open Systems Kenneth M. Kahn, Mark S. Miller in Ecology of Computation, Elsevier Science Publishers, North Holland (1988)
- Logical Secrets, Mark S. Miller, Daniel G. Bobrow, E. Dean Tribble, Jacob Levy International Conference on Logic Programming (1987), pp. 704–728
- Objects in Concurrent Logic Programming Languages, Kenneth M. Kahn, Eric Dean Tribble, Mark S. Miller, Daniel G. Bobrow, in OOPSLA (1986), pp. 242–257
- Vulcan: Logical Concurrent Objects, Kenneth M. Kahn, E. Dean Tribble, Mark S. Miller, Daniel G. Bobrow in Research Directions in Object-Oriented Programming, MIT Press (1987), pp. 75–112
- The Open Society and its Media by Mark Miller with E. Dean Tribble, Ravi Pandya, and Marc Stiegler; in Prospects in Nanotechnology
- Capability-based Financial Instruments, by Mark S Miller, Chip Morningstar, Bill Frantz; in Proceedings of Financial Cryptography 2000 (Springer-Verlag)
- The Digital Path: Smart Contracts and the Third World, 2003, Mark S. Miller, and Marc Stiegler.
- Distributed Electronic Rights in JavaScript with Tom Van Cutsem, and Bill Tulloh
- Concurrency Among Strangers, Mark Miller, E. Dean Tribble, Jonathan Shapiro
