= Scout =

Scout may refer to:

== Youth movement ==
- Scout, Boy Scout or Girl Scout, a youth, usually 10–18 years of age, participating in the Scout Movement
  - Scouts (The Scout Association), a program for 10-14 year olds in The Scout Association in the United Kingdom
  - Boy Scouts and Girl Scouts of the British Boy Scouts and British Girl Scouts Association (BBS & BGS)
  - Scouts (Baden-Powell Scouts' Association), program for both boys and girls between the ages of 10–15 years in the United Kingdom and other countries
  - Scouts BSA, a program for 11 to 17 year olds in the United States of America
- The Scout Movement
  - Traditional Scouting, a trend to return Scouting to traditional style and activities
  - World Scouts, the first and oldest international scout organization.
  - World Organization of the Scout Movement, an international organization of Scout organisations
  - International Union of Guides and Scouts of Europe
  - Confederation of European Scouts
  - World Federation of Independent Scouts
  - World Organization of Independent Scouts
  - British Boy Scouts and British Girl Scouts Association
  - The Scout Association, one of the scout organisations in the United Kingdom
  - Baden-Powell Scouts' Association, a scout organisation in the United Kingdom and other countries
- Scouting (magazine), a publication of Scouting America

== Military uses ==
- Scout, to perform reconnaissance

=== Units ===
==== United States ====
- Blazer's Scouts, a unit who conducted irregular warfare during the American Civil War
- United States Army Indian Scouts, Native Americans who were active in the American West in the late 19th–early 20th centuries
  - Apache Scouts, part of the United States Army Indian Scouts, who performed most of their service during the Apache Wars
- Cavalry scout, a reconnaissance specialist in the United States Army
- Philippine Scouts, a military organization of the United States Army from 1901 to 1948
- South Pacific Scouts, a jungle warfare unit formed during World War II from Fijians and Solomon Islanders
- Scout Sniper, a reconnaissance specialist in the U.S. Marine Corps

==== United Kingdom and Commonwealth ====
- Lovat Scouts, a Scottish Highland yeomanry regiment of the British Army in the Second Boer War
- Grey's Scouts, a Rhodesian mounted infantry unit raised in 1975
- Selous Scouts, a special forces regiment of the Rhodesian Army from 1973 to 1980

==== India ====
- Ladakh Scouts, an Indian Army high mountain and border security regiment specialized for the Ladakh region
- Arunachal Scouts, an Indian Army high mountain regiment specialized for the state of Arunachal Pradesh
- Sikkim Scouts, an Indian Army regiment specialized for the state of Sikkim

==== Pakistan ====
All are internal security and border forces in Pakistan

- Gilgit Baltistan Scouts,
- Bajaur Scouts
- Chitral Scouts

=== Equipment ===
- Scout (aircraft), pre-1920s (British) terminology for a single-seat fighter
- Scout plane, a type of shipborne surveillance aircraft
- Scout rifle, a class of general-purpose rifles
  - Steyr Scout, a modern scoped bolt-action rifle manufactured by Steyr Mannlicher
- AD Scout, a fighter aircraft designed to defend Britain from Zeppelin bombers during World War I
- IAI Scout, an unmanned air vehicle used by the Israel Defense Forces during the 1982 Lebanon War
- Westland Scout, British military helicopter
- HMS Scout, the name of various British Royal Navy ships
- USS Scout, the name of various United States Navy ships
- Ajax (armoured vehicle), formerly Scout SV, an armoured fighting vehicle

== Occupations ==
- Scout (association football), attends football matches to collect intelligence
- Scout (sport), a professional sports talent-scout
- Scout, a role responsible in artists and repertoire for recruiting recording artists and songwriters
- Scout or bedder, a domestic assistant at Oxford University

== Transportation ==
=== Aircraft ===
- Aeronca K Scout, an American light airplane first marketed in 1937
- Aeryon Scout, a small reconnaissance unmanned aerial vehicle (UAV) designed and built in Canada
- American Champion Scout, a two-seat, high-wing, single-engined airplane that entered production in the U.S. in 1974
- Eagles Wing Scout, an American powered parachute
- Tennessee Propellers Scout, an American powered parachute design

=== Other transportation ===
- Scout (autonomous boat), an autonomous boat designed to complete a transatlantic crossing
- Scout (train), a passenger train of the Atchison, Topeka and Santa Fe Railway, inaugurated in 1916
- Scout Motor Services, absorbed into Ribble Motor Services, both former bus operators in North West England
- International Scout, an off-road vehicle which was produced from 1961 to 1980
- Scout Motors, a planned electric vehicle brand owned by Volkswagen Group

== Arts and entertainment ==
- Scout (1987 film), a 1987 British television film by Frank McGuinness in the anthology series ScreenPlay
- Scout (comics), a comic book series by Timothy Truman, first published in 1985
- Scout, a playable class type in the 2007 video game Team Fortress 2
- Scout trooper, a soldier of the Galactic Empire in Star Wars

== Other uses ==
- Scout (name), a list of people and fictional characters with the given name Scout
- Scout (operating system), at the University of Arizona
- Scout (rocket family), American launch vehicles designed to place small satellites into orbit around the Earth
- Scout (travel website), a travel website
- Scout.com, a sports publishing company
- Mars Scout Program, a U.S. initiative to send a series of small, low-cost robotic missions to Mars
- Scout, an education toy line of LeapFrog Enterprises
- Scout (Dutch parliament), an appointed role following a Dutch parliamentary election to assist in the formation of a new government

== See also ==
- The Scout (disambiguation)
- Guide (disambiguation)
- Pioneer (disambiguation)
- Indian scout (disambiguation)
