= BareMetal =

- Developer: Return Infinity
- Written in: Assembly
- Working state: Current
- Source model: Open source
- Initial release: 2008; 18 years ago
- Latest release: 2025.04 / April 30, 2025; 18 months ago
- Marketing target: HPCs, HTC, Cloud computing
- Available in: English
- Supported platforms: x86-64
- Kernel type: Exokernel, SASOS
- Userland: Unknown
- Default user interface: Command-line
- License: BSD License
- Official website: www.returninfinity.com

BareMetal is an exokernel-based single address space operating system (OS) created by Return Infinity.

It is written in assembly to achieve high-performance computing with minimal footprint with a "just enough operating system" (JeOS) approach. The operating system is primarily targeted towards virtualized environments for cloud computing, or HPCs due to its design as a lightweight kernel (LWK). It could be used as a unikernel.

It was inspired by another OS written in assembly, MikeOS, and it is a recent example of an operating system that is not written in C or C++, nor based on Unix-like kernels.

== Overview ==
=== Hardware requirements ===
- AMD/Intel based 64-bit computer
- Memory: 4 MB (plus 2 MB for every additional core)
- Hard Disk: 32 MB

=== Supported devices ===
- Bus - PCIe, PCI, xHCI
- Non-volatile storage - NVMe, AHCI (SATA), ATA, Virtio-Blk
- Ethernet - Intel 8259x 10-gigabit, Intel 8254x/8257x Gigabit, Realtek 816x/811x Gigabit, Virtio-Net

=== One task per core ===
Multitasking on BareMetal is unusual for modern operating systems. BareMetal uses an internal work queue that all CPU cores poll. A task added to the work queue will be processed by any available CPU core in the system and will execute until completion, which results in no context switch overhead.

== Programming ==
=== API ===
An API is documented but, in line with its philosophy, the OS does not enforce entry points for system calls (e.g.: no call gates or other safety mechanisms).

=== C ===
BareMetal OS has a build script to pull the latest code, make the needed changes, and then compile C code using the Newlib C standard library.

=== C++ ===
A mostly-complete C++11 Standard Library was designed and developed for working in ring 0. The main goal of such library is providing, on a library level, an alternative to hardware memory protection used in classical OSes, with help of carefully designed classes.

=== K ===
k for BareMetal: a port of k edu from shakti by Jack Andrews. At this stage, it is just a proof of concept and doesn't integrate the BareMetal file system.

=== Rust ===
A Rust program demonstration was added to the programs in November 2014, demonstrating the ability to write Rust programs for BareMetal OS.

== Networking ==
=== TCP/IP stack ===
A TCP/IP stack was the #1 feature request. A port of lwIP written in C was announced in October 2014.

minIP, a minimalist IP stack in ANSI C able to provide enough functionalities to serve a simple static webpage, is being developed as a proof of concept to learn the fundamentals in preparation for an x86-64 assembly re-write planned for the future.
