= Ed Lazowska =

American computer scientist (born 1950)

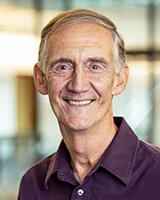
- Born: Edward Delano Lazowska; August 3, 1950
- Education: Brown University (BA); University of Toronto (MSc, PhD)
- Scientific career
- Fields: Computer scientist
- Workplaces: University of Washington
- Thesis: Characterizing Service Time and Response Time Distributions in Queueing Network Models of Computer Systems (1977)
- Doctoral advisor: Kenneth C. Sevcik
- Doctoral students: Thomas E. Anderson; Edward Felten; Hank Levy; Lin Yi-bing
- Website: lazowska.cs.washington.edu

Edward Delano Lazowska (born August 3, 1950) is an American computer scientist. He is the Bill & Melinda Gates Chair Emeritus in the Paul G. Allen School of Computer Science & Engineering at the University of Washington, having "retired" in 2025 after 48 years on the faculty.

== Scholarship ==
Lazowska’s research and teaching have concerned the design, implementation, and analysis of high-performance computing and communication systems, and, more recently, the techniques and technologies of data-intensive science.

He co-authored the definitive textbook on computer system performance analysis using queuing network models, contributed to several early object-oriented distributed systems, and co-developed widely used approaches to kernel and system design in areas such as thread management, high-performance local and remote communication, load sharing, cluster computing, and the effective use of the underlying architecture by the operating system.

From 2008 to 2017 he served as the Founding Director of the University of Washington eScience Institute, one of three partners (along with Berkeley and New York University) in the Data Science Environments effort sponsored by the Gordon and Betty Moore Foundation and the Alfred P. Sloan Foundation.

== Leadership ==
Lazowska chaired the Computing Research Association from 1997 to 2001, the NSF CISE Advisory Committee from 1998 to 1999, the DARPA Information Science And Technology (ISAT) Study Group from 2004 to 2006, the President’s Information Technology Advisory Committee (co-chair with Marc Benioff) from 2003 to 2005, and the Working Group of the President’s Council of Advisors on Science and Technology to review the Federal Networking and Information Technology Research and Development Program in 2010 (co-chair with David E. Shaw).

From 2007 to 2013 he served as Founding Chair of the Computing Community Consortium, a national effort funded by the National Science Foundation to engage the computing research community in fundamental research motivated by tackling societal challenges. From 2018-24 he served as a Councillor of the National Academy of Engineering.

He served as Chair of University of Washington Computer Science & Engineering from 1993 to 2001, a period during which that program consolidated its reputation as one of the top computer science programs in the nation and the world.

A long-time advocate for broadening participation in the field, Lazowska has served on the Executive Advisory Council of the National Center for Women & Information Technology, on the National Academies Committee on Women in Science, Engineering, and Medicine, and on the National Academies study committee on the Impacts of Sexual Harassment in Academia.

== Civic engagement ==
Lazowska has served as a board member or technical advisor for a number of technology companies, venture firms, and technology-oriented civic organizations, including the Allen Institute for Artificial Intelligence, Microsoft Research, Madrona Venture Group, Voyager Capital, Pioneer Square Labs, the Washington Technology Industry Association, and the Technology Alliance.

== Students ==
Lazowska has mentored many dozens of graduate students and many hundreds of undergraduate students. Among the best known are Hank Levy (University of Washington), Yi-Bing Lin (National Chiao Tung University), Tom Anderson (University of Washington), Ed Felten (Princeton University), and Christophe Bisciglia (successively Google, Cloudera, and WibiData).

== Recognition ==
Lazowska is a Member (and from 2018-24 was a Councillor) of the National Academy of Engineering, a Fellow of the American Academy of Arts & Sciences, a Member of the Washington State Academy of Sciences, and a Fellow of the Association for Computing Machinery, the Institute of Electrical and Electronics Engineers, and the American Association for the Advancement of Science.

In recognition of his national leadership Lazowska received the Computing Research Association Distinguished Service Award, the Association for Computing Machinery Presidential Award, and the ACM Distinguished Service Award.

Regionally, he received the 2007 University of Washington Computer Science & Engineering Undergraduate Teaching Award, the 2012 Howard Vollum Award for Distinguished Accomplishment in Science and Technology, the 1998 University of Washington Outstanding Public Service Award (for his K-12 outreach activities), the 2015 University of Washington David B. Thorud Leadership Award (for his institutional leadership activities), and the 2026 University of Washington Alumni Association Distinguished Teaching Legacy Award (honoring "an extraordinary UW teacher who has influenced and inspired students long after they graduated").

In honor of Lazowska's 70th birthday in August 2020, Peter Lee and Jeff Dean began raising funds to endow a set of Lazowska Professorships at the University of Washington. Joined by Harry Shum and Brad Smith, they contributed sufficient funds to endow the first professorship; others subsequently funded several more. A celebration was held in May 2022 to recognize Lazowska and formally announce the professorships.

== Personal history ==
Lazowska was born on August 3, 1950, in Washington, D.C. He obtained his A.B. at Brown University in 1972, advised by Andries van Dam and David J. Lewis, and his M.Sc. in 1974 and Ph.D. in 1977 at the University of Toronto, advised by Kenneth C. Sevcik. He is married to Lyndsay Downs. They have two sons, Adam Lazowska and Jeremy Lazowska.
