= Amr Awadallah =

Egyptian-American computer scientist and entrepreneur

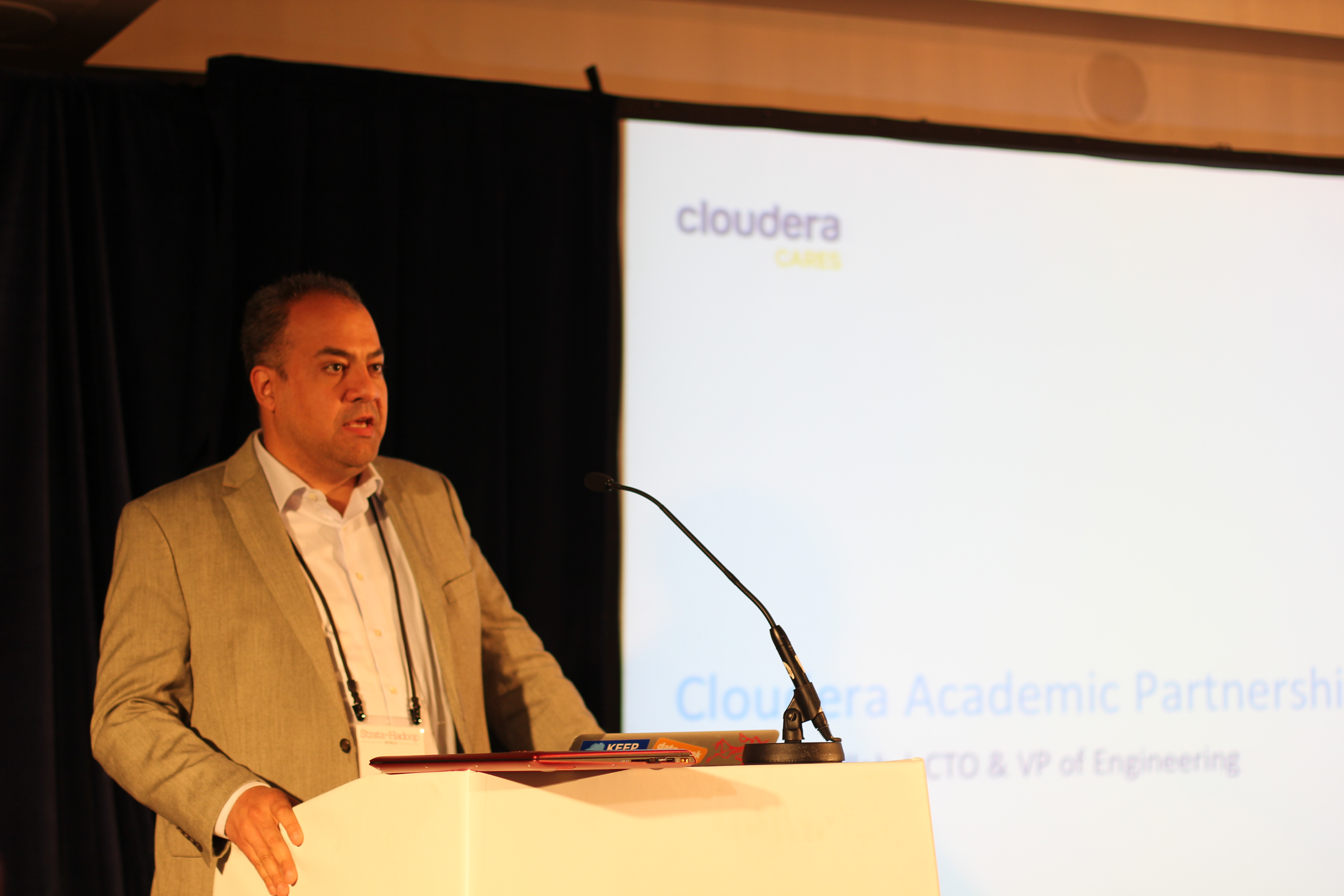
- Awadallah in 2015
- Education: Cairo University (BS, MS) Stanford University (PhD)
- Occupations: Computer scientist, entrepreneur
- Known for: Co-founding Cloudera and Vectara

Amr Awadallah is an Egyptian-American computer scientist and entrepreneur. He is a co-founder of Cloudera and Vectara. At Cloudera, he served as chief technology officer and helped build the company into one of the best-known commercial vendors in the Apache Hadoop ecosystem.

== Education ==
Awadallah earned bachelor's and master's degrees in electrical engineering from Cairo University. He later completed a PhD in electrical engineering at Stanford University. His doctoral dissertation was titled The vMatrix: A Backward-Compatible Solution for Improving the Interactivity, Scalability, and Reliability of Internet Applications.

== Career ==
Awadallah co-founded VivaSmart, an e-commerce content management and product-search startup that was acquired by Yahoo in 2000. After the acquisition, he worked at Yahoo for eight years. He later became vice president of product intelligence engineering, and was associated with Yahoo's early use of Hadoop for large-scale data analysis.

In 2008, Awadallah co-founded Cloudera with Christophe Bisciglia, Jeff Hammerbacher, and Mike Olson. As chief technology officer, he was part of the leadership team that helped commercialize Hadoop-based enterprise data platforms. Cloudera became a public company in 2017.

Awadallah later served as vice president of developer relations at Google Cloud. In July 2021, Google parted ways with him after internal criticism over a LinkedIn post in which he discussed his past antisemitic beliefs and views on the Israeli-Palestinian conflict.

In 2022, he co-founded Vectara, an artificial intelligence and search company.
