= Midori (operating system) =

Microkernel-based operating system by Microsoft

- Developer: Microsoft Corporation
- Written in: C# custom variant M#
- OS family: Capability-based
- Working state: Discontinued
- Initial release: 2008; 17 years ago
- Final release: Final / 2015; 10 years ago
- Update method: Compile from source code
- Supported platforms: IA-32, x86-64, ARM
- Kernel type: Microkernel (Language-based)

Midori (which means green in Japanese) is an experimental managed code operating system (OS) that was in development until 2015. A joint effort by Microsoft and Microsoft Research, it had been reported to be a possible commercial implementation of the OS Singularity, a research project begun in 2003 to build a highly dependable OS whose kernel, device drivers, and application software would all be written in managed code. It was designed for concurrency, and would run a program spread across multiple nodes at once. It also featured a security model that sandboxes applications for increased security. Microsoft had mapped out several possible migration paths from Windows to Midori. Midori was discontinued some time in 2015, though many of its concepts were used in other Microsoft projects.

== History ==
The code name Midori was first discovered through the PowerPoint presentation CHESS: A systematic testing tool for concurrent software.

Another reference to Midori was found in a presentation shown during the Object-Oriented Programming, Systems, Languages & Applications (OOPSLA) October 2012 conference, and a paper from the conference's proceedings.
