= IncludeOS =

- Developer: IncludeOS AS
- Written in: C++
- Source model: Open source
- Initial release: August 18, 2014; 11 years ago
- Marketing target: Cloud computing
- Supported platforms: x86, x86-64
- Kernel type: Unikernel
- Userland: POSIX subset, custom
- License: Apache License 2.0
- Official website: www.includeos.org

IncludeOS is a minimal, open source, unikernel operating system for cloud services and IoT, developed by Alf Walla and Andreas Åkesson. IncludeOS allows users to run C++ applications in the cloud without any operating system.

IncludeOS runs on virtual machines like Linux KVM, and VMWare ESXi/Fusion.

IncludeOS applications boot in about 300 ms. On Solo5/uKVM from IBM Research, boot times as low as 10 milliseconds are possible.

== Architecture ==
The minimalist architecture of IncludeOS means that it does not have any virtual memory space. In turn, therefore, there is no concept of either system calls or user space.
