= IntusCare =

IntusCare is a U.S.-based healthcare technology company providing an end-to-end technology ecosystem built to help Programs of All-Inclusive Care for the Elderly (PACE) programs deliver exceptional care, strengthen financial performance, and stay compliant.

The company offers a comprehensive, PACE-native electronic medical record (EMR) platform that can be integrated with specialized risk adjustment, population health, utilization management, and compliance services and solutions to drive PACE clinical and operational excellence, financial performance, and effortless compliance.

IntusCare serves more than 70 PACE organizations supporting more than 50,000 participants.

== History ==
IntusCare was founded in 2019 by Robbie Felton, Evan Jackson, Samuel Prado, and Alex Rothberg while they were students at Brown University. The company was established with the goal of helping providers make data-driven decisions to improve care delivery and outcomes for high-need patient populations. The company's early development centered on an analytics platform that synthesized healthcare data to identify risks, visualize trends, and optimize care for PACE participants.

The company launched its initial population health analytics product in 2020, first implemented at PACE of Rhode Island.

In 2024, IntusCare introduced additional products, including IRIS risk adjustment, population health and utilization management services (PRISM), and announced the launch of CareHub EMR in early 2025, an integrated care management and EMR platform designed for PACE programs. CareHub EMR was first implemented in May 2025 at PACE Organization of Rhode Island. As of May 2026, the company implemented CareHub at 33 PACE programs across 16 states.

In July 2026, IntusCare introduced DataHub, a HIPAA-compliant data warehouse for PACE programs using CareHub EMR.

== Products and services ==
IntusCare offers a technology ecosystem designed for PACE that helps providers manage complex clinical, operational, and financial workflows.

Their product and service offerings include:

- CareHub, a PACE-native Electronic Medical Record (EMR)
- DataHub, a HIPAA-compliant data warehouse
- PRISM, population health and utilization management tech-enabled services for PACE
- IRIS, AI-powered PACE risk adjustment technology and services
- ILLUMINATE, PACE compliance services.

By combining its EMR, CareHub, with AI automation tooling and advanced data infrastructure, IntusCare enables organizations to better manage medical risk, improve care coordination, stay compliant, and improve financial performance while reducing operational complexity.

== Funding and partnerships ==
In 2026, IntusCare announced a majority growth investment and partnership with Blue Star Innovation Partners to expand its platform for PACE and senior care providers.

Prior, the company reported total funding exceeding $27 million, including an $11.5 million follow-on round led by Deerfield Management with participation from Citi Impact Fund and Jumpstart Nova.

== Recognition ==
In 2023, IntusCare was listed as a Top 50 Emerging Health IT Vendor per Black Book Research, LLC. All three founders were recognized by Forbes 30 under 30 in 2024. In 2025, IntusCare was named a finalist for the McKnight's Excellence in Technology Awards for Emerging Technology category for their work with Palm Beach PACE. Robbie Felton, CEO of IntusCare, was named a Top 50 in Digital Health System Disruptor honoree by Rock Health and was also included in Modern Healthcare’s 40 Under 40 awards in 2026.
