= Cray Urika-XA =

Extreme analytics platform, manufactured by supercomputer maker Cray

The Cray Urika-XA extreme analytics platform, manufactured by supercomputer maker Cray Inc., was an appliance that analyzes the massive amounts of data—usually called big data—that supercomputers collect. It was introduced in 2015 and discontinued in 2017. Organizations that use supercomputers have traditionally used multiple smaller off-the-shelf systems for data analysis. But as organizations see a dramatic increase in the amount of data they collect—everything from research data to retail transactions—they need data analytics systems that can make sense of it and help them use it strategically. In a nod to organizations that lean toward open-source software, the Urika-XA comes pre-installed with Cloudera Enterprise Hadoop and Apache Spark.
