= Halle Tecco =

American academic and author

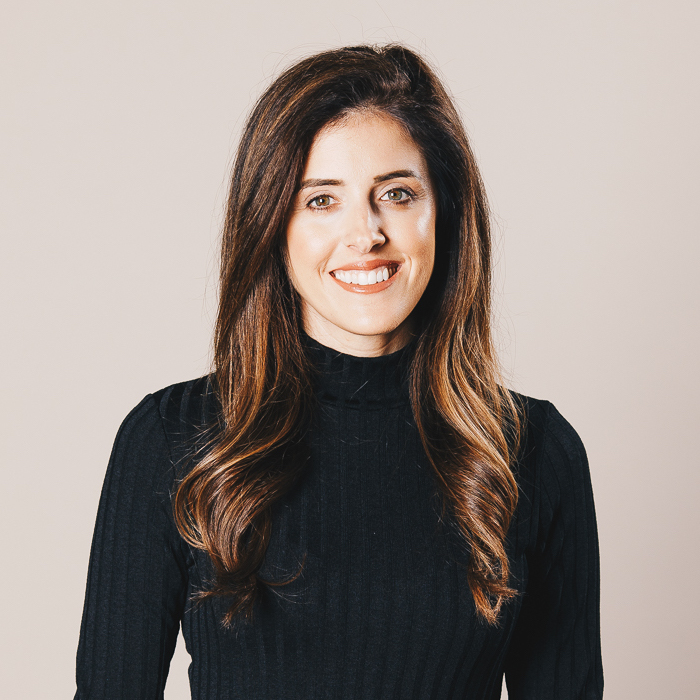
- Born: 1982 or 1983 (age 42–43)
- Education: Case Western Reserve University, BS; Harvard Business School, MBA; Johns Hopkins University, MPH
- Occupations: Founder, Natalist; Founder, Rock Health; Founder, Techammer

Halle Tecco (born 1982 or 1983) is the author of Massively Better Healthcare: The Innovator's Guide to Tackling Healthcare's Biggest Challenges, adjunct professor at Columbia Business School, founder and former CEO at Rock Health and Natalist, and an angel investor and philanthropist.

== Education ==
Tecco earned a BS from Case Western and an MBA from Harvard Business School, where she launched Rock Health as a student. She received her MPH at Johns Hopkins University with a concentration in Women's and Reproductive Health.

== Career ==
In 2006, Tecco founded a non-profit, Yoga Bear, which connects cancer fighters and survivors with online access to yoga classes designed for those undertaking treatment. In 2007, Tecco co-founded Techammer with her husband. In 2017, they invested $10,000 in Bitcoin in 2013 and made $250,000 which they donated to cancer research.

In 2010, she founded digital health venture fund Rock Health, where she served as CEO until May 2016.

In 2019, she founded Natalist, a reproductive health company focused on fertility and pregnancy products. In 2021, Natalist was acquired by Everly Health.

In 2026, Tecco published her first book, Massively Better Healthcare: The Innovator's Guide to Tackling Healthcare's Biggest Challenges, published by Columbia University Press.

== Awards ==
Tecco was named one of San Francisco Chronicle's Most Powerful Women in Technology (2014), Goldman Sach's Most Intriguing Entrepreneurs (2013), and Forbes 30 under 30 (2013).

== Personal life ==
Tecco is married to Jeff Hammerbacher, cofounder of Cloudera. Through in vitro fertilization she gave birth to a son in 2017.

== Bibliography ==
- Massively Better Healthcare: The Innovator's Guide to Tackling Healthcare's Biggest Challenge. Columbia University Press. 2026. ISBN 978-0231222365.
