= Verve =

Verve may refer to:

== Music ==
- The Verve, an English rock band
- The Verve E.P., a 1992 EP by The Verve
- Verve (R. Stevie Moore album)
- Verve Records, an American jazz record label

== Businesses ==
- Verve Coffee Roasters, an American coffee house chain
- Verve Energy, a corporation owned by the Government of Western Australia
- Verve International, a payment card brand
- Ford Verve concepts, a series of small car concepts from Ford of Europe

== Other uses ==
- Verve (French magazine), an art magazine
- Verve (Indian magazine), a luxury-lifestyle magazine
- Verve (operating system), an operating system by Microsoft Research
- VRV (streaming service), pronounced verve
