= Phantom OS =

Orthogonally persistent managed-code general purpose operating system

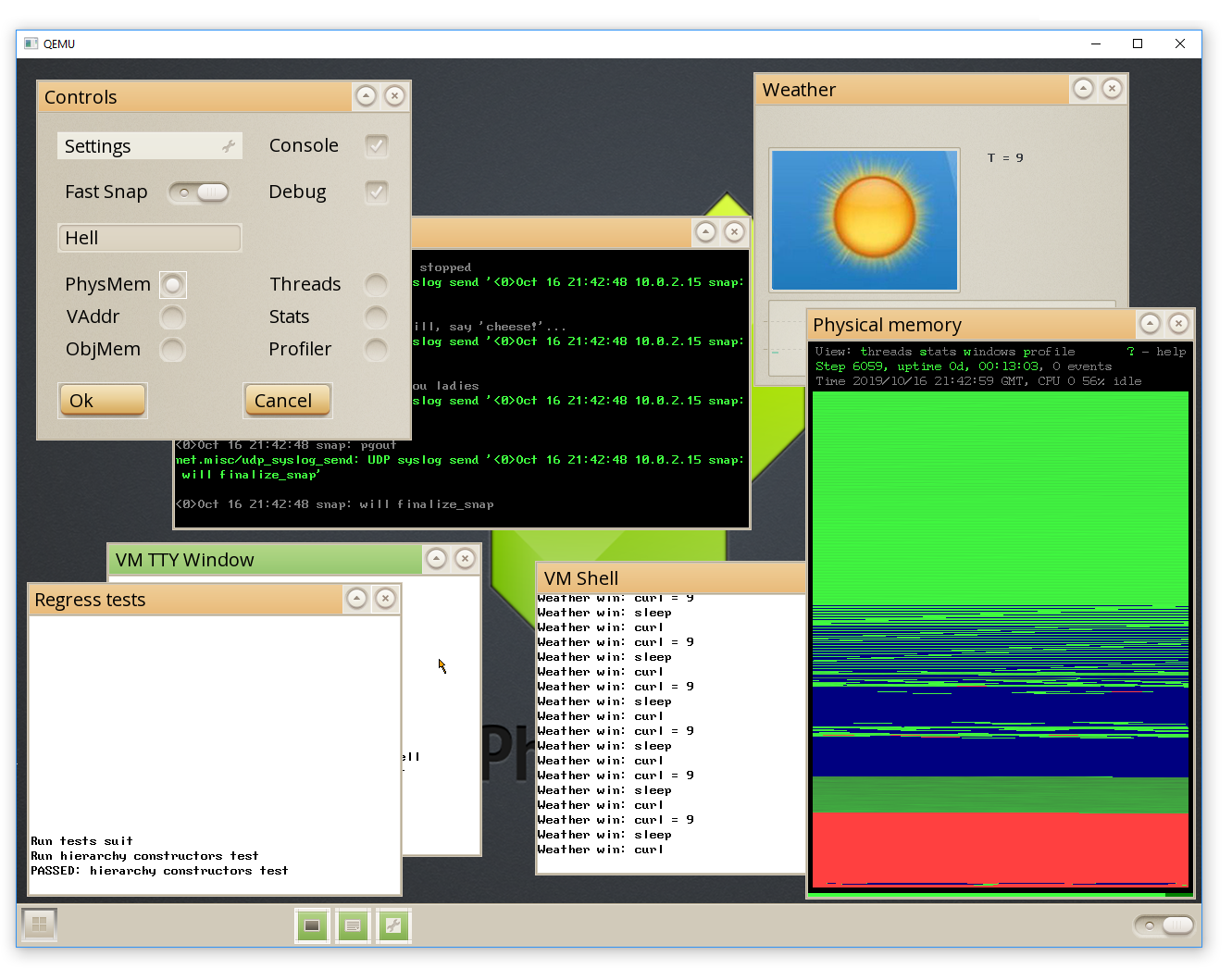
- OS Phantom screenshot for 17 October 2019
- Developer: Digital Zone
- Written in: C, Phantom, Java
- OS family: RTOS
- Working state: Active
- Source model: FOSS
- Latest release: latest / October 17, 2019; 7 years ago
- Repository: github.com/dzavalishin/phantomuserland
- Available in: Russian, English
- Supported platforms: IA-32
- Kernel type: Microkernel
- License: LGPL
- Official website: phantomos.org

Phantom OS is an orthogonally persistent managed code general-purpose operating system. It is based on a concept of persistent virtual memory, and executes bytecode in a virtual machine. It is one of a few OSes not based on the classic concepts of Unix-like systems. Phantom is based on the principle that "Everything is an object", in contrast to the Unix-like approach of "Everything is a file".

== Overview ==
Phantom was founded by Dmitry Zavalishin and is being developed mostly by Russian programmers. It is free and open-source software (FOSS) released under a GNU Lesser General Public License (LGPL).

== Basics ==
Managed code – Memory protection on object level, rather than process level; absence of pointer arithmetic in managed code avoids many problems that exist and occur in unmanaged code.

Global address space – Inexpensive inter-process communication (IPC). Single (flat) address space allows transfer of objects from one process (application) to another by transferring links to that object. Security is achieved by the absence of pointer arithmetic and the inability of an application to get linked to an object other than by calling a public method.

Persistence – Application code does not see OS restarts and can live forever—this does not use the concept of a file and any variable or data structure can be stored forever and at the same time be available directly through a pointer. Contrary to hibernation, which is done in other OSs, persistence lies in the very core principles of the Phantom OS core. The implementation creates snapshots continuously and transparently to the applications maintaining consistent internal state without pausing applications.

== Compatibility ==
Two ways to migrate code are offered:

- Converter from Java virtual machine (JVM) bytecode; is supposed to permit the import of bytecode from Java and other programming languages that target the JVM.
- The Portable Operating System Interface (POSIX) subsystem allows porting application code from Unix and Linux, although important features of Phantom OS such as persistence become unavailable.

== Status ==
As of October 2019, the system exists as an alpha version for x86 IA-32 processors. Porting to ARM architecture is underway (currently being tested, not yet ready for use) and porting to MIPS architecture and x86-64 (AMD64) has begun. Kernel operation has been demonstrated at the biggest Russian IT-conferences RIT 2011, ADD 2010, CC 2010, and 2009.

A Genode-based fork has been in development since 2020.

== See also ==
- IBM i
- EROS (microkernel)
- Singularity (operating system)

== Sources ==
- "Source codes of Phantom OS". Digital Zone. 2009.
- "Phantom OS Internals book". 2019.
- "Phantom OS on OpenHUB". 2019.
