= Nemesis (operating system) =

Operating system

- Developer: University of Cambridge
- Working state: Discontinued
- Latest release: II / April 26, 1999
- Available in: English
- Platforms: x86 Alpha; ARM
- Default user interface: Graphical user interface
- License: Nemesis Free License
- Official website: www.cl.cam.ac.uk/research/srg/netos/projects/archive/nemesis/

Nemesis was an operating system that was designed by the University of Cambridge, the University of Glasgow, the Swedish Institute of Computer Science and Citrix Systems.

Nemesis was conceived with multimedia uses in mind. It was designed with a small lightweight kernel, using shared libraries to perform functions that most operating systems perform in the kernel. This reduces the processing that is performed in the kernel on behalf of application processes, transferring the activity to the processes themselves and facilitating accounting for resource usage.

The ISAs that Nemesis supports include x86 (Intel i486, Pentium, Pentium Pro, and Pentium II), Alpha and ARM (StrongARM SA–110). Nemesis also runs on evaluation boards (21064 and 21164).

== See also ==
- Exokernel
- Xen
- Kernel-wide design approaches
