= Emerald (programming language) =

- Paradigm: object-oriented
- Designed by: Andrew P. Black, Norman C. Hutchinson, Eric B. Jul, Henry M. Levy
- First appeared: 1980s
- Typing discipline: strong, static
- Website: www.emeraldprogramminglanguage.org

Influenced by
- Pascal, Simula, Smalltalk

Influenced
- Java, Singularity

Emerald is a distributed, object-oriented programming language developed in the 1980s by Andrew P. Black, Norman C. Hutchinson, Eric B. Jul, and Henry M. Levy, in the Department of Computer Science at the University of Washington.

A simple Emerald program can create an object and move it around the system:

const Kilroy ←  object Kilroy
  process
  const origin ←  locate self
  const up ← origin.getActiveNodes
  for e in up
   const there ← e.getTheNode
   move self to there
  end for
  move self to origin
  end process
end Kilroy

Emerald was designed to support high performance distribution, location, and high performance of objects, to simplify distributed programming, to exploit information hiding, and to be a small language.
