= JX (operating system) =

Java-based microkernel operating system

- Developer: University of Erlangen
- Source model: Free software
- Final release: 0.1.1 / October 10, 2007; 18 years ago
- Supported platforms: IA-32 (x86)
- Kernel type: Microkernel
- License: GPLv2 or later
- Official website: JX Project

JX is a free, open source, microkernel operating system developed by the University of Erlangen with both the kernel and applications implemented using the Java programming language.

== Overview ==
JX is implemented as an extended Java virtual machine (the JX Core), adding support to the Java system for features such as protection domains and hardware access, along with several components written in Java that provide kernel facilities to applications running on the computer. Because Java is a type-safe language, JX can provide isolation between running applications without needing to use hardware memory protection. This technique, known as language-based protection means that system calls and inter-process communication in JX does not cause an address space switch, an operation which is slow on most computers. JX runs on standard PCs, supporting a limited range of common hardware elements.

The primary goals of JX include:

- Based on a small trusted computing base (TCB) security system
- Lack of address space switching.
- It is a highly flexible operating system with different configuration possibilities.

== See also ==
- JavaOS
