= Scout (operating system) =

Scout is a research operating system developed at the University of Arizona. It is communication-oriented and designed around the constraints of network-connected devices like set-top boxes.

The Scout researchers had in mind a class of devices that they called "network appliances", which include cameras and disks attached to a network. They believed that these devices have in common the following three characteristics:

- Communication-Oriented
- Specialized/Diverse Functionality
- Predictable Performance with Scarce Resources

To satisfy these three requirements, Scout was designed around an abstraction called a "path"; was highly configurable; and offered scheduling and resource allocation policies that provided predictable performance under load.

== See also ==
- Single address space operating system
