= The Scout =

The Scout may refer to:

- The Scout (Kansas City, Missouri statue), an iconic statue located in Penn Valley Park in Kansas City, Missouri
- The Scout (Portland, Oregon), a copy of sculptor R. Tait McKenzie's The Ideal Scout
- The Scout, a statue commissioned as the South African War Memorial, Brisbane in Queensland, Australia
- 1983: The Scout (1983 film), a DEFA Indianerfilm
- The Scout (1989 film), an Iranian film
- The Scout (1994 film), an American comedy film
- The Scout (2025 film), an American drama film
- Buffalo Bill - The Scout, a statue of Buffalo Bill Cody in Cody, Wyoming
- The Scout (train), a passenger train on the Atchison, Topeka and Santa Fe Railway
- The Scout (magazine), an official publication for Boy Scouts from 1908
- The Scout, a character from the 2007 video game Team Fortress 2
