= WibiData =

Defunct software company

- Type: Private
- Industry: Software development
- Founded: 2010
- Defunct: 2015
- Headquarters: San Francisco, California
- Key people: Christophe Bisciglia, Aaron Kimball, Garrett Wu, Rob Seaman
- Products: WibiRetail, WibiEnterprise
- Website: http://www.wibidata.com/

WibiData was a software company that developed big data applications for enterprises to personalize their customer experiences. It developed applications based on open-source technologies Apache Hadoop, Apache Cassandra, Apache HBase, Apache Avro and the Kiji Project. Wibidata was founded under the name Odiago in 2010 by Christophe Bisciglia, Aaron Kimball, and Garrett Wu. Based in San Francisco, California, WibiData was backed by investors such as Canaan Partners, New Enterprise Associates, SV Angel, and Eric Schmidt.

In 2014, WibiData laid off much of their staff, stating that they are "reorienting itself".
