= Rock Health =

American digital health funding company

- Company type: 501(c)(3)
- Industry: Digital Health
- Founded: August 2010
- Founders: Halle Tecco and Nate Gross
- Headquarters: San Francisco, California
- Website: rockhealth.com

Rock Health is a full-service seed fund that supports startups working in digital health, also called health technology. Rock Health offers funding, access to medical, venture, legal and corporate partners, and office space to its portfolio companies.

== History ==
Rock Health was founded in 2010 by Harvard Business School classmates Halle Tecco and Nate Gross. Rock Health's inaugural portfolio class began in June 2011. Gross went on to co-found Doximity with Jeff Tangney, previously co-founder of Epocrates. In October 2016, Rock Health named pharma veteran Bill Evans as managing director.

== Partners ==
Rock Health partners include Fenwick & West, GE, Genentech, Harvard Medical School, Kaiser Permanente, Kleiner Perkins Caufield & Byers, Mayo Clinic, Mohr Davidow Ventures, Montreux Equity Partners, Qualcomm Life, UnitedHealth Group, and UCSF.
