= Jeff Hammerbacher =

American data scientist

Jeff Hammerbacher (born 1982 or 1983) is an American data scientist. He was chief scientist and cofounder at Cloudera and later served on the faculty of the Icahn School of Medicine at Mount Sinai.

== Early life ==
Hammerbacher was born in 1982 or 1983. He grew up in Fort Wayne, Indiana. His father worked at the General Motors plant and his mother was a nurse. From an early age he had an interest in numbers. He studied math at Harvard University, where he became acquainted with Facebook cofounder Mark Zuckerberg. He took a year off during college and worked a variety of jobs, including stints at a bookstore and the GM assembly line alongside his father.

== Career ==
After graduation, Hammerbacher joined Bear Stearns as a quantitative analyst, working there for less than a year. In April 2006, he joined Facebook where he led the data team before leaving the company in 2008. Hammerbacher was an entrepreneur in residence at Accel Partners immediately prior to cofounding Cloudera in 2008 where he was the chief scientist.

Hammerbacher has been featured for his work in Forbes, Fast Company, MIT Technology Review, Harvard Business Review, NY Times, Bloomberg BusinessWeek and others.

== Personal life ==
Hammerbacher is married to the entrepreneur Halle Tecco. They jointly run an angel fund named Techammer. They have a son.

== Selected publications ==
- Segaran, Toby; Hammerbacher, Jeff (2009). Beautiful Data: the stories behind elegant data solutions (First ed.). Sebastopol, California: O'Reilly. ISBN 9780596157111. OCLC 827947721.
