= Scout (autonomous boat) =

Scout is an autonomous robotic boat designed to complete the first autonomous transatlantic crossing. The project was started by Tiverton students Dylan Rodriguez and Max Kramers in 2010 with the goal of creating an autonomous craft to make the journey from Rhode Island to Sanlucar de Barrameda, Spain. After several iterations, Scout's first transatlantic attempt was launched from Sakonnet Point on June 29, 2013, but unfavourable weather conditions forced the team to recover the craft the same day. A second launch was made July 4, 2013 but after two days a technical failure forced another recovery effort and a redesign of parts of the vessel. The third attempt was launched during the early morning of August 24, 2013 and is currently in progress but has already earned the record for distance of an unmanned Atlantic naval voyage.

== Technical specifications ==
Scout is based on a custom carbon fiber hull with a Divinycell foam core and measures 12.8 feet long, 25 inches wide and weighs 160 pounds. The vessel design incorporates a bulb keel to right the craft in heavy seas, and propulsion is provided by an electric trolling motor powered by a bank of solar-charged lithium iron phosphate batteries. On-board control and navigation is provided by two Arduino microcontrollers and a GPS receiver, and telemetry data is sent back to the team using the Iridium satellite constellation and provided live on the World Wide Web.
