= Scout (name) =

Scout is an English name after the military reconnaissance term.

== People ==
- Scout Durwood, American performer
- Scout Niblett, English singer-songwriter
- Scout Taylor-Compton, American actress
- Scout Tufankjian, Armenian-American photojournalist

== Fictional characters ==
- Scout Finch, protagonist in To Kill a Mockingbird by Harper Lee
- Mark Scout and Gemma Scout, two characters in the TV show Severance
