= Christophe Bisciglia =

American computer scientist

- Born: 1980 (age 45–46)
- Education: Computer Science and Engineering from University of Washington
- Known for: Co-founding Cloudera and WibiData

Christophe Bisciglia (born 1980) is an American entrepreneur known for his work with big data and cloud computing. Known for helping to popularize the programming model MapReduce while working at Google, and in addition he co-founded Cloudera and WibiData.

== Early life and education ==
Bisciglia was born in 1980, and raised primarily in Gig Harbor, Washington. Bisciglia attended the University of Washington from 1999 to 2003 and graduated in 2003 with a bachelor of science degree from the department of Computer Science and Engineering. In 2015 he received an Honorary Doctorate degree from University of Washington.

== Computer science ==
Bisciglia's primary contribution to computer science has been the introduction of hands-on large-scale computing into the undergraduate computer science curriculum originally developed at the University of Washington. In 2008, along with co-authors, Aaron Kimball and Sierra Michels-Slettvet, Bisciglia published a research paper titled "Cluster Computing for Web-Scale Data Processing." This paper details the first MapReduce based large-scale computing course ever offered to undergraduate students, and has provided the foundation for similar courses at Carnegie Mellon University, Massachusetts Institute of Technology (MIT), and Tsinghua University.

== Career ==
After graduating college he joined Google to work as software engineer on search quality. He founded and lead Google's Academic cloud computing initiative which provides Google hosted computational resources to facilitate education and research to universities around the world. In February 2008, the National Science Foundation joined this initiative to distribute Google's computational resources to the national research community. In 2008, Fortune (magazine) named Bisciglia as one of the 10 most fascinating Googlers and in 2010 he was named one of the smartest people in tech.

Bisciglia left Google in 2008 in order to co-found Cloudera, in Palo Alto. The Cloudera company is now headquartered in Santa Clara and provides tools, services, and support, around data processing networks, like Hortonworks data platform, and Apache Hadoop. WibiData was founded by Bisciglia in 2010 and closed in 2015, and it was a San Francisco-based company that provided big data applications for enterprises to personalize their customer experiences. In 2018, he became a partner in the Inn at Kulaniapia Falls, a nature retreat in Hilo, Hawaii.

== Selected publications ==
- Kimball, A.; Michels-Slettvet, S.; Bisciglia, C. (2008). "Cluster computing for web-scale data processing". ACM SIGCSE Bulletin. 40: 116–120. doi:10.1145/1352322.1352177.
