= Cloudera =

American data lake software company

Cloudera, Inc.
- Type: Private
- Industry: Software; Cloud computing
- Founded: June 27, 2008; 18 years ago
- Founders: Christophe Bisciglia; Amr Awadallah; Jeff Hammerbacher; Mike Olson
- Headquarters: Santa Clara, California, U.S.
- Key people: Charles Sansbury (CEO); Abhas Ricky (CBO)
- Products: Analytics tools Big data tools Data engineering tools Data science tools Data warehousing tools ETL; Machine learning tools Streaming data tools
- Services: Cloud data platform
- Owner: Clayton, Dubilier & Rice; Kohlberg Kravis Roberts
- Website: www.cloudera.com

Cloudera, Inc. is an American data lake software company.

== History ==
Cloudera, Inc. was formed on June 27, 2008 in Burlingame, California by Christophe Bisciglia, Amr Awadallah, Jeff Hammerbacher, and chief executive Mike Olson. Prior to Cloudera, Bisciglia, Awadallah, and Hammerbacher were engineers at Google, Yahoo!, and Facebook respectively, and Olson was a database executive at Oracle after his previous company Sleepycat was acquired by Oracle in 2006. The four were joined in 2009 by Doug Cutting, a co-founder of Hadoop.

Cloudera originally offered a free product based on Hadoop, earning revenue by selling support and consulting services around it. In March 2009, the company began offering a commercial distribution of Hadoop.

In 2009 the company received a $5 million investment led by Accel Partners. This was followed by a $25 million funding round in October 2010 and a $40M funding round in November 2011.

In June 2013, Olson transitioned from CEO to Chairman of the Board and Chief Strategy Officer. Tom Reilly, former CEO of ArcSight, was appointed CEO.

In March 2014, Cloudera raised another $160 million in funding from T. Rowe Price and other investors. Intel invested $740 million in Cloudera for an 18% stake in the company (a $4.1 billion company valuation). These shares were repurchased by Cloudera in December 2020 for $314 million.

On April 28, 2017, the company became a public company via an initial public offering. Over the next four years, the company's share price declined in the wake of falling sales figures and competition from public cloud services like Amazon Web Services. In October 2018, Cloudera and Hortonworks announced their merger, which the two companies completed the following January. Five months later, CEO Reilly and founder Olson left the company in June 2019. Board member Martin Cole was appointed as temporary CEO.

In January 2020, former Hortonworks CEO Rob Bearden was appointed as Cloudera's CEO.

In October 2021, the company went private after an acquisition by KKR and Clayton, Dubilier & Rice in an all cash transaction valued at approximately $5.3 billion.

In October 2023, R2 Solutions LLC filed a civil complaint against Cloudera in the United States District Court for the Western District of Texas for patent infringement. That same month, StreamScale won a $240 million jury verdict against Cloudera for patent infringement.

In June 2024, Cloudera acquired Verta, an AI startup specializing in managing large language models. This followed Cloudera's launch of a SaaS data lakehouse and was positioned as a way to strengthen operational AI capabilities.

== Products and services ==
Cloudera provides the Cloudera Data Platform, a collection of products related to cloud services and data processing. Some of these services are provided through public cloud servers such as Microsoft Azure or Amazon Web Services, while others are private cloud services that require a subscription. Cloudera markets these products for purposes related to machine learning and data analysis.

Cloudera has adopted the marketing term "data lakehouse," which derives from a combination of the terms "data lake" and "data warehouse."

Cloudera has formed partnerships with companies such as Dell, IBM, and Oracle.

In 2022, Cloudera announced support for Apache Iceberg.

In October 2026 Cloudera settled with US govt for PERM process irregularities which is step for Green card processing
