= Henry M. Levy =

American computer scientist

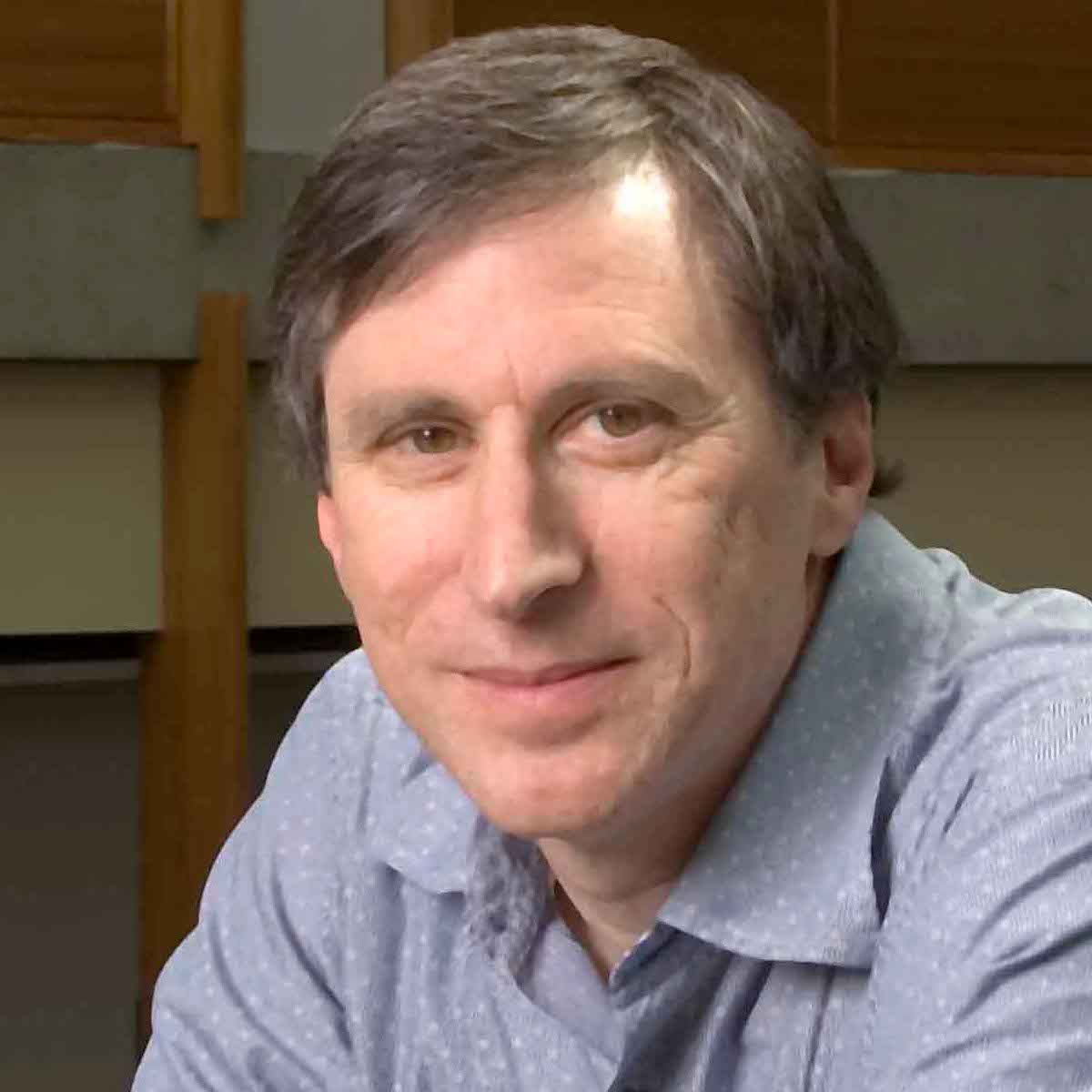
- Education: Carnegie Mellon University (BS); University of Washington (MS)
- Website: cs.washington.edu/people/faculty/levy

Henry M. Levy is an American computer scientist. Currently retired from the University of Washington, he previously served as Professor and Wissner-Slivka Chair in Computer Science and Engineering at the university.

== Education ==
Levy received a Bachelor of Science with a major in mathematics/computer science from Carnegie Mellon University in 1974 and a Master of Science in computer science from the University of Washington in 1981.

== Work ==
Levy's research concerns operating systems, distributed systems, the internet, and computer architecture. In his early career, Levy worked at Digital Equipment Corporation (DEC), where he was a member of the design and engineering team for the VMS operating system for the VAX computer. His graduate work resulted in the book Capability-Based Computer Systems. He joined the University of Washington Department of Computer Science & Engineering as a faculty member in 1983. In 2006 Levy became Chair of the department, and in 2017, when the department was elevated to become the Paul G. Allen School of Computer Science & Engineering, Levy became the first Director of the School, serving until the end of 2019, after over 13 years of leadership. Over that time he oversaw significant growth of the program and its stature, as well as the design and construction of two new buildings, the Paul G. Allen Center and the Bill & Melinda Gates Center. He was involved with several early object-oriented distributed systems (Eden and Emerald), and also with the invention of simultaneous multithreading. Levy co-founded two startups, Performant (founded in 2000 and acquired by Mercury in 2003), and Skytap (founded in 2006). He is a member of the National Academy of Engineering (NAE), a fellow of the Association for Computing Machinery (ACM), and a fellow of the Institute of Electrical and Electronics Engineers (IEEE).

Levy is also curator of an art collection for the Allen School. The resulting collection represents nearly thirty artists, each with some connection to the University of Washington. Artists represented include Jacob Lawrence, George Tsutakawa, Kenneth Callahan, Akio Takamori, Alden Mason, Imogen Cunningham, Art Wolfe, and Chuck Close.

Levy joined Google as a Distinguished Engineer in 2020.
