= Join-pattern =

Software design pattern for parallel computing

- Paradigm: concurrent computing, distributed programming
- Developer: INRIA Inria
- Website: Inria Join

Major implementations
- Join Java, Polyphonic C#, Unified Parallel C, Cω, Joins library, Boost.

Influenced
- Join Calculus

Join-patterns provides a way to write concurrent, parallel and distributed computer programs by message passing. Compared to the use of threads and locks, this is a high level programming model using communication constructs model to abstract the complexity of concurrent environment and to allow scalability. Its focus is on the execution of a chord between messages atomically consumed from a group of channels.

This template is based on join-calculus and uses pattern matching. Concretely, this is done by allowing the join definition of several functions and/or channels by matching concurrent call and messages patterns. It is a type of concurrency pattern because it makes easier and more flexible for these entities to communicate and deal with the multi-threaded programming paradigm.

== Description ==
The join-pattern (or a chord in Cω) is like a super pipeline with synchronisation and matching. In fact, this concept is summarise by match and join a set of message available from different message queues, then handles them all simultaneously with one handler. It could be represented by the keywords when to specify the first communication that we expected, with the and to join/pair other channels and the do to run some tasks with the different collected messages. A constructed join pattern typically takes this form:

j.When(a1).And(a2). ... .And(an).Do(d)

Argument a1 of When(a1) may be a synchronous or asynchronous channel or an array of asynchronous channels. Each subsequent argument ai to And(ai) (for i > 1) must be an asynchronous channel.

More precisely, when a message matches with a chain of linked patterns causes its handler to run (in a new thread if it's in asynchronous context) otherwise the message is queued until one of its patterns is enabled; if there are several matches, an unspecified pattern is selected.

Unlike an event handler, which services one of several alternative events at a time, in conjunction with all other handlers on that event, a join pattern waits for a conjunction of channels and competes for execution with any other enabled pattern.

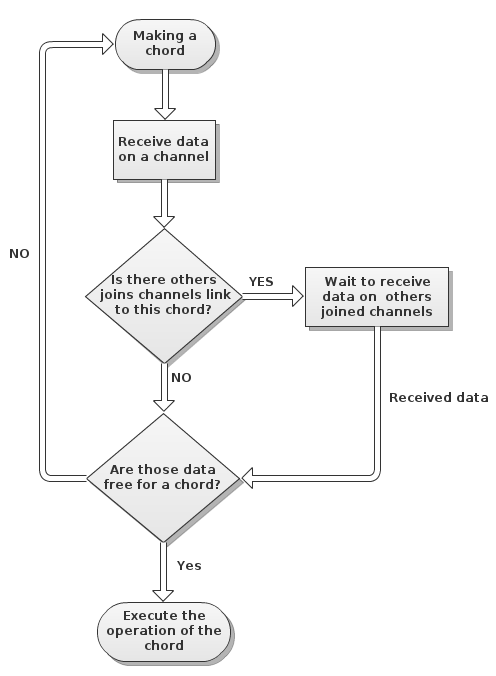
This flow diagram shows how the join pattern is executed by a general match with different channels (wait a chord) and synchronizes the resources (free or lock).

Join-pattern is defined by a set of pi-calculus channels x that supports two different operations, sending and receiving, we need two join calculus names to implement it: a channel name x for sending (a message), and a function name x for receiving a value (a request). The meaning of the join definition is that a call to x() returns a value that was sent on a channel x<>. Each time functions are concurrently, triggers the return process and synchronizes with other joins.

J ::= //join patterns
| x<y> //message send pattern
| x(y) //function call pattern
| J | JBIS //synchronization

From a client’s perspective, a channel just declares a method of the same name and signature. The client posts a message or issues a request by invoking the channel as a method. A continuation method must wait until/unless a single request or message has arrived on each of the channels following the continuation’s When clause. If the continuation gets to run, the arguments of each channel invocation are dequeued (thus consumed) and transferred (atomically) to the continuation’s parameters.

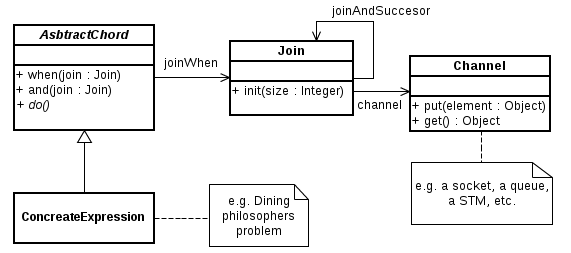
Class diagram of the Join pattern

In most of cases, the order of synchronous calls is not guaranteed for performance reasons. Finally, during the match the messages available in the queue could be stolen by some intervening thread; indeed, the awakened thread may have to wait again.

== History ==
=== π-calculus – 1992 ===
The π-calculus belongs to the family of process calculi, allows mathematical formalisms for describing and analyzing properties of concurrent computation by using channel names to be communicated along the channels themselves, and in this way it is able to describe concurrent computations whose network configuration may change during the computation.

=== Join-Calculus – 1993 ===
Join patterns first appeared in Fournet and Gonthier’s foundational join-calculus, an asynchronous process algebra designed for efficient implementation in a distributed setting. The join-calculus is a process calculus as expressive as the full π-calculus. It was developed to provide a formal basis for the design of distributed programming languages, and therefore intentionally avoids communications constructs found in other process calculi, such as rendezvous communications.

=== Distributed Join-Calculus – 1996 ===
The Join-Calculus is both a name passing calculus and a core language for concurrent and distributed programming. That's why the Distributed Join-Calculus based on the Join-Calculus with the distributed programming was created on 1996. This work use the mobile agents where agents are not only programs but core images of running processes with their communication capabilities.

=== JoCaml, Funnel and Join Java – 2000 ===
JoCaml and Funnel are functional languages supporting declarative join patterns. They present the ideas to direct implement a process calculi in a functional setting.

Another extensions to (non-generic) Java, JoinJava, were independently proposed by von Itzstein and Kearney.

=== Polyphonic C# – 2002 ===
Cardelli, Benton and Fournet proposed an object-oriented version of join patterns for C# called Polyphonic C#.

=== Cω – 2003 ===
Cω is adaptation of join-calculus to an object-oriented setting. This variant of Polyphonic C# was included in the public release of Cω (a.k.a. Comega) in 2004.

=== Scala Joins – 2007 ===
Scala Joins is a library to use Join-Pattern with Scala in the context of extensible pattern matching in order to integrate joins into an existing actor-based concurrency framework.

=== JErlang – 2009 ===
Erlang is a language which natively supports the concurrent, real time and distributed paradigm. Concurrency between processes was complex, that's why the project build a new language, JErlang (J stands for Join) using based on the Join-calculus.

== Join-pattern in classic programming literature ==
"Join-patterns can be used to easily encode related concurrency idioms like actors and active objects."

- Barriers

using Microsoft.Research.Joins;

class SymmetricBarrier
{
    public readonly Synchronous.Channel Arrive;

    public SymmetricBarrier(int n)
    {
        // Create j and init channels (elided)
        JoinPattern pat = j.When(Arrive);
        for (int i = 1; i < n; i++)
        {
            pat = pat.And(Arrive);
        }
        pat.Do(() => { });
    }
}

- Dining philosophers problem

using Microsoft.Research.Joins;

Join j = Join.Create();
Synchronous.Channel[] hungry;
Asynchronous.Channel[] chopstick;
j.Init(out hungry, n);
j.Init(out chopstick, n);

for (int i = 0; i < n; i++)
{
    Asynchronous.Channel left = chopstick[i];
    Asynchronous.Channel right = chopstick[(i + 1) % n];
    j.When(hungry[i]).And(left).And(right).Do(() => {
        eat();
        left();
        right(); // replace chopsticks
    });
}

- Mutual exclusion

using Microsoft.Research.Joins;

class Lock
{
    public readonly Synchronous.Channel Acquire;
    public readonly Asynchronous.Channel Release;

    public Lock()
    {
        // Create j and init channels (elided)
        j.When(Acquire).And(Release).Do(() => { });
        Release(); // initially free
    }
}

- Producers/Consumers

using Microsoft.Research.Joins;

class Buffer<T>
{
    public readonly Asynchronous.Channel<T> Put;
    public readonly Synchronous<T>.Channel Get;

    public Buffer()
    {
        Join j = Join.Create(); // allocate a Join object
        j.Init(out Put);
        // bind its channels
        j.Init(out Get);
        j.When(Get).And(Put).Do // register chord
        (t => { return t; });
    }
}

- Reader-writer locking

using Microsoft.Research.Joins;

class ReaderWriterLock
{
    private readonly Asynchronous.Channel idle;
    private readonly Asynchronous.Channel<int> shared;
    public readonly Synchronous.Channel AcqR, AcqW, RelR, RelW;

    public ReaderWriterLock()
    {
        // Create j and init channels (elided)
        j.When(AcqR).And(idle).Do(() => shared(1));
        j.When(AcqR).And(shared).Do(n => shared(n + 1));
        j.When(RelR).And(shared).Do(n => {
            if (n == 1)
            {
                idle();
            }
            else
            {
                shared(n - 1);
            }
        });
        j.When(AcqW).And(idle).Do(() => { });
        j.When(RelW).Do(() => idle());
        idle(); // initially free
    }
}

- Semaphores

using Microsoft.Research.Joins;

class Semaphore
{
    public readonly Synchronous.Channel Acquire;
    public readonly Asynchronous.Channel Release;

    public Semaphore(int n)
    {
        // Create j and init channels (elided)
        j.When(Acquire).And(Release).Do(() => { });
        while (n > 0)
        {
            Release(); // initially n free
            --n;
        }
    }
}

== Fundamental features and concepts ==
- Join-calculus : The first apparition of the Join-Pattern comes out with this process calculus.
- Message passing : Join-pattern works with a message passing system for parallel reason.
- Channel : Channels are used to synchronize and pass messages between concurrently executing threads. In general, a channel may be involved in more than one join pattern, each pattern defines a different continuation that may run when the channel is invoked .
- Synchronous : The join-pattern could use a synchronous channel which return a result. The continuation of a synchronous pattern runs in the thread of the synchronous sender.
- Asynchronous : It could also use an asynchronous channel which return no result but take arguments. The continuation of an asynchronous pattern runs in a newly spawned thread. A join pattern may be purely asynchronous, provided its continuation is a subroutine and its When clause only lists asynchronous channels.
- Combine synchronous and asynchronous : Merging the declarations of synchronous and asynchronous buffer would yield a module that supports the two communication type of consumers.
- Scheduler : There is a scheduling between join patterns (e.g. a round-robin scheduler, first-match scheduler).
- Design patterns : The join-pattern is first of all a behavioral and a concurrency pattern.
- Concurrent programming : It's execute in a concurrent way.
- Pattern matching : The join-pattern works with matching tasks.
- Parallel programming : It performs tasks in parallel.
- Distributed programming : Jobs could be scatter on different agent and environments with this pattern.
- Software transactional memory : Software transactional memory (STM) is one of the possible implementation for the communications between joint.
- Overlapping : The pattern could allow patterns declared on overlapping sets of channels.

== Application domain ==
=== Mobile agent ===
A mobile agent is an autonomous software agent with a certain social ability and most importantly, mobility. It is composed of computer software and data which can move between different computers automatically while continuing their executions.

The mobile agents can be used to match concurrency and distribution if one uses the Join-calculus. That's why a new concept named "distributed Join-calculus" was created; it's an extension of Join-calculus with locations and primitives to describe the mobility. This innovation use agents as running processes with their communication capabilities to allow an idea of location, which is a physical site expressing the actual position of the agent. Thanks to the Join-calculus, one location can be moved atomically to another site.

The processes of an agent is specified as a set which define its functionality including asynchronous emission of a message, migration to other location. Consequently, locations are organized in a tree to represent the movement of the agent easier. With this representation, a benefit of this solution is the possibility to create a simple model of failure. Usually a crash of a physical site causes the permanent failure of all its locations. But with the join-calculus a problem with a location can be detected at any other running location, allowing error recovery.

So the Join-calculus is the core of a distributed programming language. In particular, the operational semantics is easily implementable in a distributed setting with failures. So the distributed join-calculus treats channel names and location names as first class values with lexical scopes. A location controls its own moves, and can only move towards a location whose name it has received. This provides a sound basis for static analysis and for secure mobility. This is complete for expressing distributed configurations. In the absence of failure, however, the execution of processes is independent of distribution. This location transparency is essential for the design of mobiles agents, and very helpful for checking their properties.

In 2007, an extension of the basic join calculus with methods which make agents proactive has come out. The agents can observe an environment shared between them. With this environment, it is possible to define shared variables with all agents (e.g. a naming service to discover agents between themselves).

=== Compilation ===
Join-languages are built on top of the join-calculus taken as a core language. So all the calculus are analysed with asynchronous processes and the join pattern provides a model to synchronize the result.
To do this, it exists two Compilers:

- Join Compiler: A compiler of a language named "join langage". This language has been created only for the join calculus
- Jocaml Compiler: A compiler of an extension of Objectif Caml created to use the join calculus.

This two compiler works with the same system, an automaton.

let A(n) | B() = P(n)
and A(n) | C() = Q(n)
;;

It represents the consumption of message arrive at a completed join model. Each state is a possibly step for the code execution and each transitions is the reception of a message to change between two steps. And so when all messages are grab, the compiler execute the body join code corresponding to the completed model joint.

So in the join-calculus, the basic values are the names like on the example is A,B or C. So the two compiler representing this values with two ways.
Join compiler use a vector with Two slots, the first to the name it-self and the second to a queue of pending messages.
Jocaml use name like a pointer on definitions. This definitions store the others pointer of the others names with a status field and a matching date structure by message.
The fundamental difference is when the guard process is executed, for the first, it was verify if all names are the pending messages ready whereas the second use only one variable and access at the others to know if the model is completed.

Recent research describe the compilation scheme as the combination of two basic steps: dispatching and forwarding. The design and correctness of the dispatcher essentially stems from pattern matching theory, while inserting an internal forwarding step in communications is a natural idea, which intuitively does not change process behavior. They made the observation that the worth observing is a direct implementation of extended join-pattern matching at the runtime level would significantly complicate the management of message queues, which would then need to be scanned in search of matching messages before consuming them.

== Implementations and libraries ==
There are many uses of the Join-patterns with different languages. Some languages use join-patterns as a base of theirs implementations, for example the Polyphonic C# or MC# but others languages integrate join-pattern by a library like Scala Joins for Scala or the Joins library for VB. Moreover, the join-pattern is used through some languages like Scheme to upgrade the join-pattern.

	JErlang	CB	Joins Library	Polyphonic C#	Parallel C#	Cω	Scala Joins	F#	Scheme	Join Java	Hume	JoCaml
Patterns matching	Yes	Yes	Yes	Yes	Yes	Yes	Yes	Yes	Yes	Yes	Yes	Yes
Scheduler between join-patterns	Yes : first match	Yes : first/round robin	Yes	Yes	Yes	Yes	Yes	Yes	No	Yes : random	Yes : first/round robin	Yes : random
Generics	Yes	—N/a	Yes	No	—N/a	No	Yes	Yes	No	No	No	No
Overriding	No	Yes	—N/a	—N/a	—N/a	Yes	Yes	Yes	No	Yes	No	No

=== Join Java ===
Join Java is a language based on the Java programming language allowing the use of the join calculus. It introduces three new language constructs:

- Join methods is defined by two or more Join fragments. A Join method will execute once all the fragments of the Join pattern have been called. If the return type is a standard Java type then the leading fragment will block the caller until the Join pattern is complete and the method has executed. If the return type is of type signal then the leading fragment will return immediately. All trailing fragments are asynchronous so will not block the caller.

Example:

class JoinExample {
    int fragment1() & fragment2(int x) {
        // Will return value of x to caller of fragment1
        return x;
    }
}

- Asynchronous methods are defined by using the signal return type. This has the same characteristics as the void type except that the method will return immediately. When an asynchronous method is called a new thread is created to execute the body of the method.

Example:

class ThreadExample {
    signal thread(SomeObject x) {
        // This code will execute in a new thread
    }
}

- Ordering modifiers

Join fragments can be repeated in multiple Join patterns so there can be a case when multiple Join patterns are completed when a fragment is called. Such a case could occur in the example below if B(), C() and D() then A() are called. The final A() fragment completes three of the patterns so there are three possible methods that may be called. The ordered class modifier is used here to determine which Join method will be called. The default and when using the unordered class modifier is to pick one of the methods at random. With the ordered modifier the methods are prioritised according to the order they are declared.

Example:

class ordered SimpleJoinPattern {
    void A() & B() {
    }
    void A() & C() {
    }
    void A() & D() {
    }
    signal D() & E() {
    }
}

The closest related language is the Polyphonic C#.

=== JErlang ===
In Erlang coding synchronisation between multiple processes is not straightforward. That's why the JErlang, an extension of Erlang was created, The J is for Join. Indeed, To overcome this limitation JErlang was implemented, a Join-Calculus inspired extension to Erlang. The features of this language are:

- Joins allows first Match semantics and the possibility of having multiple patterns with a preservation of the messages's order.

operation() ->
    receive
        {ok, sum} and {val, X} and {val, Y} ->
            {sum, X + Y};
        {ok, mult} and {val, X} and {val, Y} ->
            {mult, X * Y};
        {ok, sub} and {val, X} and {val, Y} ->
            {sub, X - Y};
    end
end

- Guards provides additional filtering not expressing in terms of patterns. Limited number of expression without side-effects

receive
    {Transaction, M} and {limit, Lower, Upper}
        when (Lower <= M and M <= Upper ) ->
    commit_transaction(M, Transaction)
end

- With Non-linear patterns, messages can match multiple joins

receive
    {get, X} and {set, X} ->
        {found, 2, X}
end
...
receive
    {Pin, id} and {auth, Pin} and {commit, Id} ->
        perform_transaction(Pin, Id)
end

- propagation allows for copying correct messages instead of removing them.

receive
    prop({session, Id}) and {act, Action, Id} ->
        perform_action(Action, Id);
    {session, Id} and {logout, Id} ->
        logout_user(Id)
end
...
receive
    {Pin, id} and {auth, Pin} and {commit, Id} ->
        perform_transaction(Pin, Id)
end

- Synchronous calls

receive
    {accept, Pid1} and {asynchronous, Value}
                   and {accept, Pid2} ->
        Pid1 ! {ok, Value},
        Pid2 ! {ok, Value}
end

=== C++ ===
Yigong Liu has written some classes for the join pattern including all useful tools like asynchronous and synchronous channels, chords, etc. It was apparently integrated into Boost however does not seem to exist as of 2025.

import std;

template <typename V>
class Buffer: public Joint {
public:
    Async<V> put;
    Synchronous<V, void> get;

    Buffer() {
        chord(get, put, &Buffer::chordBody);
    }

    V chordBody(void_t g, V p) {
        return p;
    }
};

This example demonstrates a thread safe buffer and message queue with the basic operations put and get.

=== C# ===
==== Polyphonic C# ====
Polyphonic C# is an extension of the C# programming language. It introduces a new concurrency model with synchronous and asynchronous (which return control to the caller) methods and chords (also known as ‘synchronization patterns’ or ‘join patterns’).

public class Buffer
{
    public String get() & public async put(String s)
    {
        return s;
    }
}

This is a simple buffer example.

==== MC# ====
MC# language is an adaptation of the Polyphonic C# language for the case of concurrent distributed computations.

public handler Get2 long () & channel c1 (long x)
& channel c2 (long y)
{
    return (x + y);
}

This example demonstrates the using of chords as a synchronization tool.

==== Parallel C# ====
Parallel C# is based Polyphonic C# and they add some new concepts like movables methods, high-order functions.

using System;

class Test13
{
    int Receive() & async Send(int x)
    {
        return x * x;
    }

    public static void Main(string[] args)
    {
        Test13 t = new Test13();
        t.Send(2);
        Console.WriteLine(t.Receive());
    }
}

This example demonstrates how to use joins.

==== Cω ====
Cω adds new language features to support concurrent programming (based on the earlier Polyphonic C#). The Joins Concurrency Library for C# and other .NET languages is derived of this project.

==== Scalable Join Patterns ====
It is an easy-to-use declarative and scalable join-pattern library. In opposite to the Russo library, it has no global lock. In fact, it works with a compare-and-swap CAS and Atomic message system. The library use three improvements for the join-pattern :

- Stealing message for unused resources (allowing barging);
- Lazy queue saves both on allocation and potentially on interprocessor communication by avoiding allocate or enqueue with an optimistic fast-path;
- A status "WOKEN" : ensures that a blocked synchronous caller is woken only once.

=== JoCaml ===
JoCaml is the first language where the join-pattern was implemented. Indeed, at the beginning all the different implementation was compiled with the JoCaml Compiler. JoCaml language is an extension of the OCaml language. It extends OCaml with support for concurrency and synchronization, the distributed execution of programs, and the dynamic relocation of active program fragments during execution.

type coins = Nickel | Dime
and drinks = Coffee | Tea
and buttons = BCoffee | BTea | BCancel;;

(* def defines a Join-pattern set clause
 * "&" in the left side of = means join (channel synchronism)
 * "&" in the right hand side means: parallel process
 * synchronous_reply :== "reply" [x] "to" channel_name
 * synchronous channels have function-like types (`a -> `b)
 * asynchronous channels have types (`a Join.chan)
 * only the last statement in a pattern rhs expression can be an asynchronous message
 * 0 in an asynchronous message position means STOP ("no sent message" in CSP terminology).
   *)

def put(s) = print_endline s ; 0 (* STOP *)
  ;; (* put: string Join.chan *)

def serve(drink) = match drink with
                 Coffee -> put("Cofee")
                 | Tea -> put("Tea")
              ;; (* serve: drinks Join.chan *)

def refund(v) = let s = Printf.sprintf "Refund %d" v in put(s)
    ;; (* refund: int Join.chan *)

let new_vending serve refund =
  let vend (cost:int) (credit:int) = if credit >= cost
                      then (true, credit - cost)
                      else (false, credit)
  in
  def coin(Nickel) & value(v) = value(v+5) & reply () to coin
  or coin(Dime) & value(v) = value(v+10) & reply () to coin

  or button(BCoffee) & value(v) = 
     let should_serve, remainder = vend 10 v in
     (if should_serve then serve(Coffee) else 0 (* STOP *))
             & value(remainder) & reply () to button

  or button(BTea) & value(v) = 
     let should_serve, remainder = vend 5 v in
     (if should_serve then serve(Tea) else 0 (* STOP *))
             & value(remainder) & reply () to button

  or button(BCancel) & value(v) = refund( v) & value(0) & reply () to button
  in spawn value(0) ;
  coin, button  (* coin, button: int -> unit *)
  ;; (* new_vending: drink Join.chan -> int Join.chan -> (int->unit)*(int->unit) *)

let ccoin, cbutton = new_vending serve refund in
  ccoin(Nickel); ccoin(Nickel); ccoin(Dime);
  Unix.sleep(1); cbutton(BCoffee);
  Unix.sleep(1); cbutton(BTea);
  Unix.sleep(1); cbutton(BCancel);
  Unix.sleep(1) (* let the last message show up *)
  ;;

gives

Coffee
Tea
Refund 5

=== Hume ===
Hume is a strict, strongly typed functional language for limited resources platforms, with concurrency based on asynchronous message passing, dataflow programming, and a Haskell like syntax.

Hume does not provide synchronous messaging.

It wraps a join-pattern set with a channel in common as a box, listing all channels in an in tuple and specifying all possible outputs in an out tuple.

Every join-pattern in the set must conform to the box input tuple type specifying a '*' for non required channels, giving an expression whose type conform to the output tuple, marking '*' the non fed outputs.

A wire clause specifies

1. a tuple of corresponding input origins or sources and optionally start values
2. a tuple of output destinations, being channels or sinks (stdout, ..).

A box can specify exception handlers with expressions conforming to the output tuple.

data Coins = Nickel | Dime;
data Drinks = Coffee | Tea;
data Buttons = BCoffee | BTea | BCancel;

type Int = int 32 ;
type String = string ;
show u = u as string ;

box coffee
in ( coin :: Coins, button :: Buttons, value :: Int ) -- input channels
out ( drink_outp :: String, value’ :: Int, refund_outp :: String)  -- named outputs

match
-- * wildcards for unfilled outputs, and unconsumed inputs
  ( Nickel, *, v)  -> ( *, v + 5, *)
| ( Dime, *, v)    -> ( *, v + 10, *)
| ( *, BCoffee, v) -> vend Coffee 10 v
| ( *, BTea, v)    -> vend Tea 5 v
| ( *, BCancel, v) -> let refund u = "Refund " ++ show u ++ "\n"
                      in ( *, 0, refund v)
;

vend drink cost credit = if credit >= cost
                      then ( serve drink, credit - cost, *)
                      else ( *, credit, *);

serve drink = case drink of
               Coffee -> "Cofee\n"
               Tea -> "Tea\n"
;

box control
in (c :: char)
out (coin :: Coins, button:: Buttons)
match
 'n' -> (Nickel, *)
 | 'd' -> (Dime, *)
 | 'c' -> (*, BCoffee)
 | 't' -> (*, BTea)
 | 'x' -> (*, BCancel)
 | _ -> (*, *)
;

stream console_outp to "std_out" ;
stream console_inp from "std_in" ;

-- dataflow wiring

wire cofee
    -- inputs (channel origins)
    (control.coin, control.button, coffee.value’ initially 0)
    -- outputs destinations
    (console_outp, coffee.value, console_outp)
;

wire control
    (console_inp)
    (coffee.coin, coffee.button)
;

=== Visual Basic ===
==== Concurrent Basic – CB ====
An extension of Visual Basic 9.0 with asynchronous concurrency constructs, called Concurrent Basic (for short CB), offer the join patterns. CB (builds on earlier work on Polyphonic C#, Cω and the Joins Library) adopts a simple event-like syntax familiar to VB programmers, allows one to declare generic concurrency abstractions and provides more natural support for inheritance, enabling a subclass to augment the set of patterns. CB class can declare method to execute when communication has occurred on a particular set of local channels asynchronous and synchronous, forming a join pattern.

Module Buffer

    Public Asynchronous Put(ByVal s As String)
    Public Synchronous Take() As String

    Private Function CaseTakeAndPut(ByVal s As String) As String _
        When Take, Put
            Return s
    End Function

End Module

This example shows all new keywords used by Concurrent Basic: Asynchronous, Synchronous and When.

=== Joins library (C# and VB) ===
This library is a high-level abstractions of the Join Pattern using objects and generics. Channels are special delegate values from some common Join object (instead of methods).

using Microsoft.Research.Joins;

class Buffer
{
    public readonly Asynchronous.Channel<string> Put;
    public readonly Synchronous<string>.Channel Get;

    public Buffer()
    {
        Join join = Join.Create();
        join.Initialize(out Put);
        join.Initialize(out Get);
        join.When(Get).And(Put).Do(delegate(string s) {
            return s;
        });
    }
}

This example shows how to use methods of the Join object.

=== Scala ===
The Scala Joins library uses the Join-Pattern. The pattern matching facilities of this language have been generalized to allow representation independence for objects used in pattern matching. So now it's possible to use a new type of abstraction in libraries. The advantage of join patterns is that they allow a declarative specification of the synchronization between different threads. Often, the join patterns corresponds closely to a finite state machine that specifies the valid states of the object.

In Scala, it's possible to solve many problem with the pattern matching and Scala Joins, for example the Reader-Writer.

class ReaderWriterLock extends Joins {

  private val Sharing = new AsyncEvent[Int]
  val Exclusive, ReleaseExclusive = new NullarySyncEvent
  val Shared, ReleaseShared = new NullarySyncEvent
  join {
    case Exclusive() & Sharing(0) => Exclusive reply
    case ReleaseExclusive() => { Sharing(0); ReleaseExclusive reply }
    case Shared() & Sharing(n) => { Sharing(n+1); Shared reply }
    case ReleaseShared() & Sharing(1) => { Sharing(0); ReleaseShared reply }
    case ReleaseShared() & Sharing(n) => { Sharing(n-1); ReleaseShared reply }
  }
  Sharing(0) }

With a class we declare events in regular fields. So, it's possible to use the Join construct to enable a pattern matching via a list of case declarations. That list is representing by => with on each side a part of the declaration. The left-side is a model of join pattern to show the combination of events asynchronous and synchronous and the right-side is the body of join which is executed with the join model is completed.

In Scala, it's also possible to use the Scala's actor library with the join pattern. For example, an unbounded buffer:

val Put = new Join1[Int]
val Get = new Join
class Buffer extends JoinActor {
  def act() {
    receive { case Get() & Put(x) => Get reply x }
  } }

Scala Join and Chymyst are newer implementations of the Join Pattern, improving upon Dr. Philipp Haller's Scala Joins.

=== Haskell ===
Join Language is an implementation of the Join Pattern in Haskell.

=== Scheme ===
The Join Patterns allows a new programming type especially for the multi-core architectures available in many programming situations with a high-levels of abstraction. This is based on the Guards and Propagation. So an example of this innovation has been implemented in Scheme .

Guards is essential to guarantee that only data with a matching key is updated/retrieved. Propagation can cancel an item, reads its contents and puts backs an item into a store. Of course, the item is also in the store during the reading. The guards is expressed with shared variables. And so the novelty is that the join pattern can contains now propagated and simplified parts. So in Scheme, the part before / is propagated and the part after / is removed. The use of the Goal-Based is to divise the work in many tasks and joins all results at the end with the join pattern. A system named "MiniJoin" has implemented to use the intermediate result to solve the others tasks if it's possible. If is not possible it waits the solution of others tasks to solve itself.
So the concurrent join pattern application executed in parallel on a multi-core architecture doesn't guarantee that parallel execution lead to conflicts. To Guarantee this and a high degree of parallelism, a Software Transactional Memory (STM) within a highlytuned concurrent data structure based on atomic compare-and-swap (CAS) is use. This allows to run many concurrents operations in parallel on multi-core architecture. Moreover, an atomic execution is used to prevent the "false conflict" between CAS and STM.

== Other similar design patterns ==
Join Pattern is not the only pattern to perform multitasks but it's the only one that allow communication between resources, synchronization and join different processes.

- Sequence pattern : consists of waiting that a task have completed to switch to another (the classic implementation).
- Split pattern (parallel split) : perform several tasks in parallel at the same time (e.g. Map reduce).

== See also ==
- Joins (concurrency library) – Joins is an asynchronous concurrent computing API from Microsoft Research for the .NET Framework.
- Join-calculus – The join-calculus was developed to provide a formal basis for the design of distributed programming languages.
- Actor model - another alternative to threads that uses message passing
