= Italianism =

Italianism may refer to:

- Italian nationalism
- Italian loanwords and musical terms used in English
- Italianization

== See also ==
- Anglicism
- Anti-Italianism
- Francism (disambiguation)
- Gallicism
- Germanism (disambiguation)
- Italicism
- Latinism
