= Hume (programming language) =

Functional programming language

- Paradigm: Functional
- Family: Haskell
- Designed by: Kevin Hammond; Greg Michaelson
- Developers: University of St Andrews; Heriot-Watt University
- First appeared: 2000; 26 years ago
- Stable release: 0.8 / 25 April 2008; 17 years ago
- Typing discipline: Inferred, static, strong
- Platform: IA-32, PowerPC
- OS: macOS, Red Hat Linux

Influenced by
- Haskell

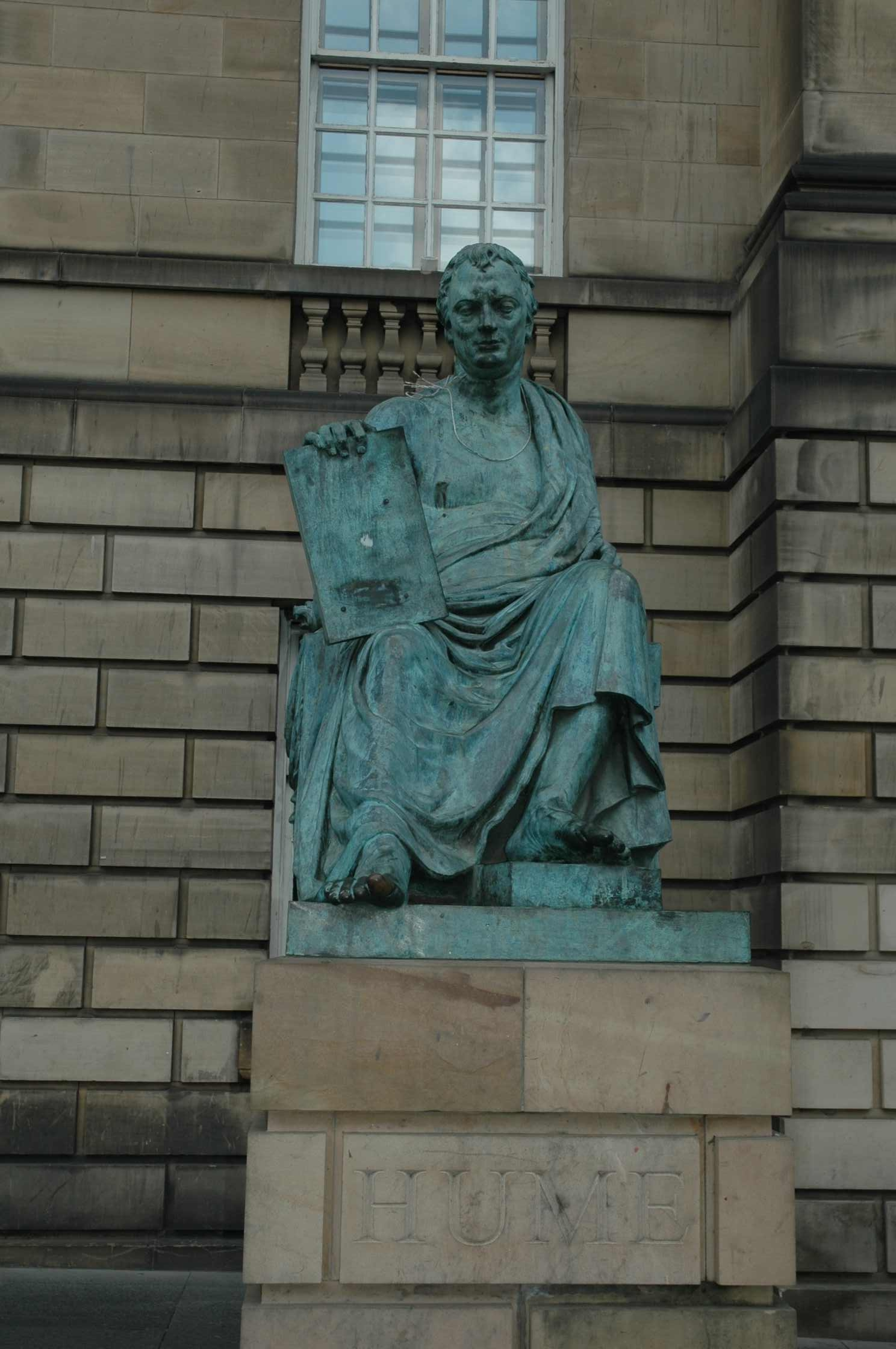
Hume Statue in Edinburgh

Hume is a functionally based programming language developed at the University of St Andrews and Heriot-Watt University in Scotland since the year 2000. The language name is both an acronym meaning 'Higher-order Unified Meta-Environment' and an honorific to the 18th-century philosopher David Hume. It targets real-time computing embedded systems, aiming to produce a design that is both highly abstract, and yet allows precise extraction of time and space execution costs. This allows guaranteeing the bounded time and space demands of executing programs.

Hume combines functional programming ideas with ideas from finite-state automata. Automata are used to structure communicating programs into a series of "boxes", where each box maps inputs to outputs in a purely functional way using high-level pattern-matching. It is structured as a series of levels, each of which exposes different machine properties.

== Design model ==
The Hume language design attempts to maintain the essential properties and features required by the embedded systems domain (especially for transparent time and space costing) whilst incorporating as high a level of program abstraction as possible. It aims to target applications ranging from simple microcontrollers to complex real-time systems such as smartphones. This ambitious goal requires incorporating both low-level notions such as interrupt handling, and high-level ones of data structure abstraction etc. Such systems are programmed in widely differing ways, but the language design should accommodate such varying requirements.

Hume is a three-layer language: an outer (static) declaration/metaprogramming layer, an intermediate coordination layer describing a static layout of dynamic processes and the associated devices, and an inner layer describing each process as a (dynamic) mapping from patterns to expressions. The inner layer is stateless and purely functional.

Rather than attempting to apply cost modeling and correctness proving technology to an existing language framework either directly or by altering a more general language (as with e.g., RTSJ), the approach taken by the Hume designers is to design Hume in such a way that formal models and proofs can definitely be constructed. Hume is structured as a series of overlapping language levels, where each level adds expressibility to the expression semantics, but either loses some desirable property or increases the technical difficulty of providing formal correctness/cost models.

== Characteristics ==
The interpreter and compiler versions differ a bit.

- the interpreter (concept prover) admits timeout and custom exceptions.
- the compiler admits heap and stack cost bounding but exceptions only print the exception name.

The coordination system wires boxes in a dataflow programming style.

The expression language is Haskell-like.

The message passing concurrency system remembers JoCaml's join-patterns or Polyphonic C Sharp chords, but with all channels asynchronous.

There is a scheduler built-in that continuously checks pattern-matching through all boxes in turn, putting on hold the boxes that cannot copy outputs to busy input destinations.

== Examples ==
=== Vending machine ===
data Coins = Nickel | Dime | Fake;
data Drinks = Coffee | Tea;
data Buttons = BCoffee | BTea | BCancel;

type Int = int 32 ;

exception EFakeCoin :: (Int, string) ;

show v = v as string ;
 
box coffee
in ( coin :: Coins, button :: Buttons, value :: Int ) -- input channels
out ( drink_outp :: string, value’ :: Int
    , refund_outp :: string, display :: string)  -- named outputs

within 500KB (400B) -- max heap ( max stack) cost bounding
handles EFakeCoin, TimeOut, HeapOverflow, StackOverflow

match
-- * wildcards for unfilled outputs, and unconsumed inputs
  ( my_coin, *, v)  {- ''join-pattern'' equivalent: coin(my_coin) & value(v) -} 
                -> let v’ = incrementCredit my_coin v
                   in ( *, v’, *, show v’)
 
           -- time bounding (''within x time-unit'') raises TimeOut ()
| ( *, BCoffee, v) {- ''join-pattern'' equivalent: button(BCoffee) & value(v) -}
                   -> (vend Coffee 10 v) within 30s 
| ( *, BTea, v)    -> (vend Tea 5 v) within 30s
| ( *, BCancel, v) -> let refund u = "Refund " ++ show u ++ "\n"
                      in ( *, 0, refund v, *)

handle
   EFakeCoin (v, msg) -> ( *, v , *, msg)
|  TimeOut () -> (*, *, *, "maybe content exhausted, call service!")
|  HeapOverflow () -> (*, *, *, "error: heap limit exceeded")
|  StackOverflow () -> (*, *, *, "error: stack limit exceeded") 
;

incrementCredit coin v = 
    case coin of
      Nickel -> v + 5
      Dime -> v + 10
      Fake -> raise EFakeCoin (v, "coin rejected")
    ; 
 
vend drink cost v = 
    if v >= cost
       then ( serve drink, v - cost, *, "your drink") 
       else ( *, v, *, "money is short of " ++ show (cost - v))
    ;
 
serve drink = case drink of
               Coffee -> "Coffee\n"
               Tea -> "Tea\n"
    ;
 
box control
in (c :: char)
out (coin :: Coins, button:: Buttons)
match
 'n' -> (Nickel, *)
 | 'd' -> (Dime, *)
 | 'f' -> (Fake, *)
 | 'c' -> (*, BCoffee)
 | 't' -> (*, BTea)
 | 'x' -> (*, BCancel)
 | _ -> (*, *)
;
 
stream console_outp to "std_out" ;
stream console_inp from "std_in" ;

-- dataflow
 
wire coffee
    -- inputs (channel origins)
    (control.coin, control.button, coffee.value’ initially 0)  -- 
    -- outputs destinations
    (console_outp, coffee.value, console_outp, console_outp) 
;
 
wire control
    (console_inp)
    (coffee.coin, coffee.button)
;
