= Parallel Extensions =

.NET managed concurrency library

The .NET Framework stack

Parallel Extensions was the development name for a managed concurrency library developed by a collaboration between Microsoft Research and the CLR team at Microsoft. The library was released in version 4.0 of the .NET Framework. It is composed of two parts: Parallel LINQ (PLINQ) and Task Parallel Library (TPL). It also consists of a set of coordination data structures (CDS) – sets of data structures used to synchronize and co-ordinate the execution of concurrent tasks.

== Parallel LINQ ==
PLINQ, or Parallel LINQ, parallelizing the execution of queries on objects (LINQ to Objects) and XML data (LINQ to XML). PLINQ is intended for exposing data parallelism by use of queries. Any computation on objects that has been implemented as queries can be parallelized by PLINQ. However, the objects need to consume the System.Linq.ParallelQuery<T> class, which is defined by PLINQ itself. Internally it uses TPL for execution.

== Task Parallel Library ==
The Task Parallel Library (TPL) is the task parallelism component of the Parallel Extensions to .NET. It exposes parallel constructs like parallel For and ForEach loops, using regular method calls and delegates, thus the constructs can be used from any CLI languages. The job of spawning and terminating threads, as well as scaling the number of threads according to the number of available processors, is done by the library itself, using a work stealing scheduler.

TPL also includes other constructs like Task and Future. A Task is an action that can be executed independent of the rest of the program. In that sense, it is semantically equivalent to a thread, except that it is a more light-weight object and comes without the overhead of creating an OS thread. Tasks are queued by a Task Manager object and are scheduled to run on multiple OS threads in a thread pool when their turn comes.

Future is a task that returns a result. The result is computed in a background thread encapsulated by the Future object, and the result is buffered until it is retrieved. If an attempt is made to retrieve the result before it has been computed then the requesting thread will block until the result is available.

The other construct of TPL is Parallel class. TPL provides a basic form of structured parallelism via three static methods in the Parallel class:

- Parallel.Invoke: Executes an array of Action delegates in parallel, and then waits for them to complete
- Parallel.For: Parallel equivalent of a C# for loop
- Parallel.ForEach: Parallel equivalent of a C# foreach loop

== Architecture ==
The main concept in the Parallel Extensions to .NET is a System.Threading.Tasks.Task, which is a small unit of code, usually represented as a lambda function, that can be executed independently. Both PLINQ and the TPL API provides methods to create the Tasks – PLINQ divides a query into smaller Tasks, and the Parallel.For, Parallel.ForEach and Parallel.Invoke methods divide a loop into Tasks.

PFX includes a Task Manager object which schedules the Tasks for execution. A Task Manager contains a global queue of Tasks, which are then executed. It also encapsulates multiple threads onto which the Tasks are executed. By default, as many threads as there are processors (or processor cores) on the system are created, though this number may be manually modified. Each thread is associated with a thread-specific queue of Tasks. When idle, each thread picks up a batch of Tasks and puts them on its local queue, where they are then executed, one by one. If the global queue is empty, a thread will look for Tasks in the queues of its peers, and will take the Tasks which have been in the queue the longest (task stealing). When in execution, the Tasks will be executed independently, with the change in state of one Task independent of others. As a result, if they use a shared resource, they still need to be synchronized manually using locks or other constructs.

== See also ==
- Concurrency and Coordination Runtime
- Joins
- Cilk/Cilk Plus – comparable technology for C and C++
- Grand Central Dispatch – comparable technology in Mac OS X 10.6 developed by Apple.
- Java Concurrency – comparable technology in Java (also known as JSR 166).
- Threading Building Blocks (TBB) – comparable technology for C++ available for many systems created originally by Intel (also open source)
- Thread pool pattern
- Task parallelism
- ReactiveX (Reactive Extensions)
