= Rendezvous =

Rendezvous or rendez-vous is a form of meeting, and may refer to:

== Arts and entertainment ==
=== Film and television ===
- The Rendezvous (1923 film), an American silent film adventure melodrama
- Rendezvous (1930 film), a German musical directed by Carl Boese
- Rendezvous (1935 film), an American spy film set in World War I
- Rendezvous (1952 TV series), an American TV series starring Ilona Massey as a spy
- Rendezvous (TV series), a 1957 anthology series, later retitled Schilling Playhouse
- Rendezvous (1961 film), a French-Italian crime film
- The Rendezvous (1972 film), a Japanese film
- C'était un rendez-vous, a 1976 French short film by Claude Lelouch
- Rendez-vous (1985 film), a French drama
- "Rendezvous" (Alias), a 2002 television episode
- "Rendezvous" (Prison Break), a 2006 television episode
- The Rendez-Vous, a 2015 Dutch film starring Loes Haverkort and Pierre Boulanger
- The Rendezvous (2016 film), an American action-adventure film
- Rendezvous (2019 film), an American short suspense-thriller

=== Music ===
==== Albums ====
- Rendezvous with Peggy Lee, 1948
- Rendezvous (Sandy Denny album), 1977
- Rendezvous (CANO album), 1979
- Rendez-Vous (Chet Baker album), 1980
- Rendezvous (George Duke Album), 1984
- Rendez-Vous (Jean Michel Jarre album), 1986
  - Rendez-Vous 98 Electronic Night, a VHS recording of Jarre's 1998 "Nuit Électronique" concert
- Rendezvous (Michel Camilo album), 1993
- Rendezvous (Jacky Terrasson and Cassandra Wilson album), 1997
- Rendez-Vous (In-Grid album), 2003
- Rendezvous (Luna album), 2004
- Rendez-Vous (Nikos Aliagas & Friends album), 2007
- Rendezvous (M.I Abaga playlist), 2018

==== Songs ====
- "Rendezvous" (Buck-Tick song), 2007
- "Rendezvous" (The Choirboys song), 1991
- "Rendezvous" (Craig David song), 2000
- "Rendezvous" (Don Toliver song), 2026
- "Rendez-vous" (song), by Pas de Deux
- "Rendez Vous" (Inna song), 2016
- "Rendez-Vu", by Basement Jaxx
- "Rendezvous", by AHOF from Who We Are, 2025
- "Rendezvous", by Bruce Springsteen from Tracks
- "Rendezvous", by the Hudson Brothers
- "Rendezvous", by Little Mix from Confetti, 2020
- "Rendezvous", by Scandroid, 2017
- "Rendezvous", by Tilt
- "Rendezvous", by Tina Charles from Heart 'n' Soul, 1977
- "Rendezvous", by Years & Years from Palo Santo, 2018
- "Rendez-vous", by Culture Beat
- "Rendez-Vous", by DJ Smash
- "Rendez-Vous", by Mucc

==== Other uses in music ====
- Rendezvous (band), an Israeli band
- Rendez-Vous (band), a post-punk French band
- Rendezvous Records, a 1950s record label
- Rendezvous Entertainment, an American record label founded by Dave Koz, Frank Cody and Hyman Katz

== Science and technology ==
- Rendezvous problem, a mathematical formulation for the optimal way to meet
- Rendezvous protocol, a type of network resource discovery protocol
- Bonjour (software), formerly Rendezvous, a computer network technology
- Rendezvous (Plan 9), a system call in the Plan 9 operating system
- Synchronous rendezvous, a concept in parallel computing
- TIBCO Rendezvous, enterprise application integration software
- Space rendezvous, a maneuver between two spacecraft

== Places ==
- Rendezvous Bay Pond, Anguilla

== Other uses ==
- Rendezvous (festival), an annual festival organized by the Indian Institute of Technology Delhi
- Rendezvous (fur trade), a large meeting once typically held annually in the American wilderness
  - Rendezvous of 1832, one of the largest fur trade rendezvous held in the Rocky Mountains
  - Fur Rendezvous Festival, an annual winter festival in Anchorage, Alaska
- Rendezvous (political cartoon)
- Rendez-vous '87, an ice hockey exhibition series
- Buick Rendezvous, an automobile
- Rendezvous Sports World, a former Indian cricket franchise
- Rocky Mountain Rendezvous, an annual fur trade gathering held at various locations, 1825–1840

== See also ==
- Rendez-vous in Montreal, a 1987 animated film
