= Anonymous type =

Anonymous types are a feature of C# 3.0, Visual Basic .NET 9.0, Oxygene, Scala and Go that allows data types to encapsulate a set of properties into a single object without having to first explicitly define a type. This is an important feature for the SQL-like LINQ feature that is integrated into C# and VB.net. Since anonymous types do not have a named type, they must be stored in variables declared using the var keyword, telling the C# compiler to use type inference for the variable. The properties created are read-only in C#, however, they are read-write in VB.net.

This feature should not be confused with dynamic typing. While anonymous types allow programmers to define fields seemingly "on the fly," they are still static entities. Type checking is done at compile time, and attempting to access a nonexistent field will cause a compiler error. This gives programmers much of the convenience of a dynamic language, with the type safety of a statically typed language.

== Examples ==
=== C# ===
var person = new { firstName = "John", lastName = "Smith" };
Console.WriteLine(person.lastName);

Output: Smith

=== Go ===
var person struct { firstName string; lastName string }
person.firstName = "John"
person.lastName = "Smith"

=== OCaml ===
let person = object val firstName = "John" val lastName = "Smith" end;;

=== Oxygene ===
var person := new class(firstName := 'John', lastName := 'Smith');

=== PHP ===
$person = new class
{
    public $firstName = "John";
    public $lastName = "Smith";
};

=== Scala ===
val person = new { val firstName = "John"; val lastName = "Smith" }

=== Visual Basic .NET ===
Dim person = New With {.firstName = "John", .lastName = "Smith"}

== See also ==
- Extension method
- Anonymous function
- Expression tree
