= Francism (disambiguation) =

Francism refers to Mouvement Franciste.

Francism may also refer to:

- FrancisM, an alias of Filipino rapper Francis Magalona

See also:

- Francoism, Spain under Francisco Franco
- Gallicism, a word borrowed from French into another language; this is sometimes called francism
