= Gallicism =

Characteristic feature of the French language occurring in another language

Gallicisms are loanwords, idioms, or expressions entered from French into other languages.

== Etymology ==
The word borrowed from French gallicisme, from Latin Gallicus (derived from Gallus, a Gaul) referring to France. An early usage in French dates 1578 at the latest. English usage dates to 1649.

== Early meaning ==
The meaning of the term varied over time. In 1757, an article by Nicolas Beauzée in the Encyclopedia of Diderot & d'Alembert defined the term as "an idiomatic expression in French, in other words a manner of speaking removed from the general laws of the language, and belonging exclusively to the French language". Beauzée further cites Dictionnaire de Trévoux: "you find many phrases and expressions that are not at all Latin, and which seem taken from the French language, you judge that the work has been written by a Frenchman; we say that book is full of gallicisms ". However Beauzée disagrees with this meaning of "gallicism" as a kind of barbarism and further gives a definition as applied to languages other than French, close to the modern one.

The 1846 A practical grammar of French rhetoric by Gabriel Surenne seconds Beauzée's definition and further said that gallicisms, with their deviation of the rules of language were seldom used in French texts of noble and elevated style, such as tragedies or serious treatises, but were welcome in comedies and other works of simple nature. In speech, an educated man could use gallicisms, e.g., to exploit the double entendre of some of them, or for other playful turns of speech.

== Modern use ==
=== English ===
French language was spoken by the English nobility for a long time since the Norman Conquest, which had a profound effect on the English language.

==== Canada ====
Canadian translator Grant Hamilton singles out the following types of gallicisms in the English speech in Canada.

- "Très chic gallicisms" - used with French accent by someone to show off their cultural sophistication, e.g., rendez-vous instead of "a date".
- "Geographic gallicisms" - French names of the places in the United States: Detroit, Des Moines, Baton Rouge, etc.
- "Visual gallicisms" in Quebec, used by Canadian Anglophones under the influence of French visual environment. For example, they may say autoroute, rather than 'highway' or French initialisms: CLSC for "local community service center".
- False friends: for example, réellement for "really" while in fact it means "actually".
- "Hidden gallicisms" - Language constructs erroneously calqued from French and which sound strange in English: "close the light" for "turn off the light" - a word-by-word calque from French fermer la lumière.
- "Nefarious gallicisms" - attempts of translators to stick to the French way of expressing things, whereas in English it should have been expressed in a different way, e.g., improperly using a French cultural context, rather than the English one, using a rare English word for a common French one, using French syntax, etc.

=== Polish ===
It is commonly accepted that French language entered Poland with Marie Louise, French-born wife of King Władysław IV Vasa, who brought French customs, attire, and vocabulary with her. After the death of King Władysław, she married his successor, John II Casimir Vasa, which furthered the influence of French at the Polish royal court. Later, John III Sobieski also took a French wife. There was even a campaign to protect Polish languiage from French among the Polish szlachta. Nevertheless, as Paris had become a cultural capital of Europe, fascination with all things French emerged during the period of Romanticism. In 20th and 21st centuries the influence of French considerably diminished, with many gallicisms replaced with anglicisms.

=== Russian ===
Gallicisms started actively entering Russian language in the 18th century. For a long time Russian elites spoke French, deeming Russian language "lowly". A well-known example is the classic Russian novel War and Peace by Leo Tolstoi, where nearly all direct speech is in French, reflecting the culture of the epoch. Modern editions supply the text with translations in numerous footnotes. A popular opinion is that "half of the novel" is in French, while in fact French constitutes only about 3.3%.

Some Gallicisms in Russian are rendered phonetically in Cyrillic in an unchanged form: Russian: визави, romanized: vizavi for "vis-à-vis", while others are naturally merged into Russian language and behave as regular Russian words: купон from "coupon". There are many words and expressions calcued from French, such as трогательный from touchant ("touching"), - all from the native words for "touch", or "иметь место" for "avoir lieu", literally "take place". A number of popular French sayings and cliches are spoken in French, such as cherchez la femme, phonetically in Russian: шерше ля фам, romanized: Shershe lya fam, "look for a woman", although these may also be translated into Russian as well.

== See also ==
- Francization
