= Germanism =

Germanism may refer to

- German nationalism
- Pan-Germanism
- Germanisation
- Germanism (linguistics)
  - German expressions in English
- Germanic philology, the philological study of the Germanic languages
- In discussions of English writing, an awkward noun phrase that seems like an attempt to construct a compound noun in the German manner, is sometimes referred to as a Germanism.

== See also ==
- Germanist, one who engages in German studies
