= Rendezvous (Plan 9) =

Rendezvous is a data synchronization mechanism in Plan 9 from Bell Labs. It is a system call that allows two processes to exchange a single datum while synchronizing.

The rendezvous call takes a tag and a value as its arguments. The tag is typically an address in memory shared by both processes. Calling rendezvous causes a process to sleep until a second rendezvous call with a matching tag occurs. Then, the values are exchanged and both processes are awakened.

More complex synchronization mechanisms can be created from this primitive operation. See also mutual exclusion.

== See also ==
- Synchronous rendezvous
- Communicating sequential processes
