= Join-calculus =

The join-calculus is a process calculus developed at INRIA. The join-calculus was developed to provide a formal basis for the design of distributed programming languages, and therefore intentionally avoids communication constructs found in other process calculi, such as rendezvous communications, which are difficult to implement in a distributed setting. Despite this limitation, the join-calculus is as expressive as the full π-calculus. Encodings of the π-calculus in the join-calculus, and vice versa, have been demonstrated.

The join-calculus is a member of the π-calculus family of process calculi, and can be considered, at its core, an asynchronous π-calculus with several strong restrictions:

- Scope restriction, reception, and replicated reception are syntactically merged into a single construct, the definition;
- Communication occurs only on defined names;
- For every defined name there is exactly one replicated reception.

However, as a language for programming, the join-calculus offers at least one convenience over the π-calculus — namely the use of multi-way join patterns, the ability to match against messages from multiple channels simultaneously.

== Implementations ==
=== Languages based on the join-calculus ===
The join-calculus programming language is a new language based on the join-calculus process calculus. It is implemented as an interpreter written in OCaml, and supports statically typed distributed programming, transparent remote communication, agent-based mobility, and some failure-detection.

- Though not explicitly based on join-calculus, the rule system of CLIPS implements it if every rule deletes its inputs when triggered (retracts the relevant facts when fired).

Many implementations of the join-calculus were made as extensions of existing programming languages:

- JoCaml is a version of OCaml extended with join-calculus primitives
- Polyphonic C# and its successor Cω extend C#
- MC# and Parallel C# extend Polyphonic C#
- Join Java extends Java
- A Concurrent Basic proposal that uses Join-calculus
- JErlang (the J is for Join, Erjang is Erlang for the JVM)

=== Embeddings in other programming languages ===
These implementations do not change the underlying programming language but introduce join calculus operations through a custom library or DSL:

- The ScalaJoins and the Chymyst libraries are in Scala
- JoinHs by Einar Karttunen and syallop/Join-Language by Samuel Yallop are DSLs for Join calculus in Haskell
- Joinads - various implementations of join calculus in F#
- CocoaJoin is an experimental implementation in Objective-C for iOS and Mac OS X
- The Join Python library in Python 3
- C++ via Boost (for boost from 2009, ca. v. 40, current (Dec '19) is 72).
