= SuperPascal =

Programming language

- Paradigm: concurrent, imperative, structured
- Family: Wirth Pascal
- Designed by: Per Brinch Hansen
- First appeared: 1993; 33 years ago
- Stable release: 1 / 1993; 33 years ago
- Typing discipline: Strong
- Website: brinch-hansen.net

Influenced by
- Communicating sequential processes, Pascal, Concurrent Pascal, Joyce, occam

SuperPascal is an imperative, concurrent computing programming language developed by Per Brinch Hansen. It was designed as a publication language: a thinking tool to enable the clear and concise expression of concepts in parallel programming. This is in contrast with implementation languages which are often complicated with machine details and historical conventions. It was created to address the need at the time for a parallel publication language. Arguably, few languages today are expressive and concise enough to be used as thinking tools.

== History and development ==
SuperPascal is based on Niklaus Wirth's sequential language Pascal, extending it with features for safe and efficient concurrency. Pascal itself was used heavily as a publication language in the 1970s. It was used to teach structured programming practices and featured in text books, for example, on compilers and programming languages. Hansen had earlier developed the language Concurrent Pascal, one of the earliest concurrent languages for the design of operating systems and real-time control systems.

The requirements of SuperPascal were based on the experience gained by Hansen over three years in developing a set of model parallel programs, which implemented methods for common problems in computer science. This experimentation allowed him to make the following conclusions about the future of scientific parallel computing:

- Future parallel computers will be general-purpose, allowing programmers to think in terms of problem-oriented process configurations. This was based on his experience programming networks of transputers, which were general-purpose processors able to be connected in arrays, trees or hypercubes.
- Regular problems in computational science require only deterministic parallelism, that is, expecting communication from a particular channel, rather than from several.
- Parallel scientific algorithms can be developed in an elegant publication language and tested on a sequential computer. When it is established an algorithm works, it can easily be implemented in a parallel implementation language.

These then led to the following requirements for a parallel publication language:

- The language should extend a widely used standard language with deterministic parallelism and message communication. The extensions should be in the spirit of the standard language.
- The language should make it possible to program arbitrary configurations of parallel processes connected by communication channels. These configurations may be defined iteratively or recursively and created dynamically.
- The language should enable a single-pass compiler to check that parallel processes do not interfere in a time-dependent manner.

== Features ==
The key ideas in the design of SuperPascal was to provide a secure programming, with abstract concepts for parallelism.

=== Security ===
SuperPascal is secure in that it should enable its compiler and runtime system to detect as many cases as possible in which the language concepts break down and produce meaningless results. SuperPascal imposes restrictions on the use of variables that enable a single-pass compiler to check that parallel processes are disjoint, even if the processes use procedures with global variables, eliminating time-dependent errors. Several features in Pascal were ambiguous or insecure and were omitted from SuperPascal, such as labels and goto statements, pointers and forward declarations.

=== Parallelism ===
The parallel features of SuperPascal are a subset of occam 2, with the added generality of dynamic process arrays and recursive parallel processes.

A parallel statement denotes that the fixed number of statements it contains must be executed in parallel. For example:

parallel
    source() |
    sink()
end

A forall statement denotes the parallel execution of a statement by a dynamic number of processes, for example:

forall i := 0 to 10 do
    something()

==== Channels and communication ====
Parallel processes communicate by sending typed messages through channels created dynamically. Channels are not variables in themselves, but are identified by a unique value known as the channel reference, which are held by channel variables. A channel is declared, for example, by the declaration

type channel = *(boolean, integer);
var c: channel;

which defines a new (mixed) type named channel and a variable of this type named c. A mixed type channel is restricted to transmitting only the specified types, in this case boolean and integer values. The channel c is initialised by the open statement:

open(c)

Message communication is then achieved with the send(channel, value) and receive(channel, variable) statements. The expression or variable providing the value for send, and the variable in receive, must both be of the same type as the first channel argument. The following example shows the use of these functions in a process that receives a value from the left channel and outputs it on the right one.

var left, right: channel; a: number;
receive(left, a);
send(right, a)

The functions send and receive can both take multiple input and output arguments respectively:

send(channel, e1, e2,..., en);
receive(channel, v1, v2,..., vn)

The following runtime communication errors can occur:

- Channel contention occurs when two parallel processes both attempt to send or receive on the same channel simultaneously.
- A message type error occurs when two parallel processes attempt to communicate through the same channel and the output expression and input variable are of different types.
- Deadlock occurs when a send or receive operation waits indefinitely for completion.

==== Parallel recursion ====
Recursive procedures can be combined with parallel and forall statements to create parallel recursive processes. The following example shows how a pipeline of processes can be recursively defined using a parallel statement.

procedure pipeline(min, max: integer; left, right: channel);
var middle: channel;
begin
  if min < max then
    begin
      open(middle);
      parallel
        node(min, left, middle) |
        pipeline(min + 1, max, middle, right)
      end
    end
  else node(min, left, right)
end;

Another example is the recursive definition of a process tree:

procedure tree(depth: integer, bottom: channel);
var left, right: channel;
begin
  if depth > 0 then
    begin
      open(left, right);
      parallel
        tree(depth - 1, left) |
        tree(depth - 1, right) |
        root(bottom, left, right)
      end
    end
  else leaf(bottom)

== Interference control ==
The most difficult aspect of concurrent programming is unpredictable or non-reproducible behaviour caused by time-dependent errors. Time-dependent errors are caused by interference between parallel processes, due to variable updates or channel conflicts. If processes sharing a variable, update it at unpredictable times, the resulting behaviour of the program is time-dependent. Similarly, if two processes simultaneously try to send or receive on a shared channel, the resulting effect is time-dependent.

SuperPascal enforces certain restrictions on the use of variables and communication to minimise or eliminate time-dependent errors. With variables, a simple rule is required: parallel processes can only update disjoint sets of variables. For example, in a parallel statement a target variable cannot be updated by more than a single process, but an expression variable (which can't be updated) may be used by multiple processes. In some circumstances, when a variable such as an array is the target of multiple parallel processes, and the programmer knows its element-wise usage is disjoint, then the disjointness restriction may be overridden with a preceding [sic] statement.

== Structure and syntax ==
SuperPascal is a block structured language, with the same basic syntax as Pascal. A program consists of a header, global variable definitions, function or procedure definitions and a main procedure. Functions and procedures consists of blocks, where a block is a set of statements. Statements are separated by semicolons, as opposed to languages like C or Java, where they are terminated by semicolons.

The following is an example of a complete SuperPascal program, which constructs a pipeline communication structure with 100 nodes. A master node sends an integer token to the first node, this is then passed along the pipeline and incremented at each step, and finally received by the master node and printed out.

program pipeline;

const
    len = 100;

type
    channel = *(integer);

var
    left, right: channel;
    value: integer;

procedure node(i: integer; left, right: channel);
var value: integer;
begin
    receive(left, value);
    send(right, value+1)
end;

procedure create(left, right: channel);
type row = array [0..len] of channel;
var c: row; i: integer;
begin
    c[0] := left;
    c[len] := right;
    for i := 1 to len-1 do
        open(c[i]);
    forall i := 1 to len do
        node(i, c[i-1], c[i])
end;

begin
    open(left, right);

    parallel
        send(left, 0) |
        create(left, right) |
        receive(right, value)
    end;

    writeln('The resulting value is ', value)
end.

== Implementation ==
The SuperPascal software can be accessed freely from the Brinch Hansen Archive. It consists of a compiler and interpreter, which are both written in normal, sequential Pascal (ISO Level 1 standard Pascal). This is supported by the GNU Pascal compiler and newer versions of the Free Pascal compiler (2.7.1+) with the -Miso switch, with the following respective small modifications to the code.

For GPC, the file interpret.p uses the non-standard clock function (line 1786), which is used to obtain the system time. Instead, the Extended Pascal getTimeStamp function can be used (which is supported by the GNU Pascal compiler), by declaring a variable of type TimeStamp, setting that with the current time using getTimeStamp and assigning the Second field of the TimeStamp to the variable t.

Free Pascal also needs a solution to the above "clock" problem (On windows, just declare gettickcount as external with "clock" as name). Further, the reset/rewrites that are marked as non-standard in the source code must be changed to assign/reset (or rewrite) pairs. (GPC probably only errors on this if you enable strict flags), and the C preprocessor commands #include 'xx' must be changed to {$include 'xx'}.

{ Time code for readtime in Freepascal on unix systems }
Function  FpTime(var tloc : integer): integer; external name 'FPC_SYSC_TIME';

procedure readtime(
 var t:  integer);
begin
  { A nonstandard function reads
    the processor time in ms }
  t:=fptime(t);
end;
