= Joyce (programming language) =

- Paradigm: concurrent, imperative, structured
- Family: Wirth Pascal
- Designed by: Per Brinch Hansen
- First appeared: 1987; 38 years ago
- Stable release: 1 / 1987; 38 years ago
- Typing discipline: Strong

Influenced by
- Communicating sequential processes, Pascal, Concurrent Pascal

Influenced
- SuperPascal

Joyce is a secure programming language for concurrent computing designed by Per Brinch Hansen in the 1980s. It is based on the sequential language Pascal and the principles of communicating sequential processes (CSP). It was created to address the shortcomings of CSP to be applied as a programming language, and to provide a tool, mainly for teaching, for distributed computing system implementation.

The language is based around the concept of agents; concurrently executed processes that communicate only by the use of channels and message passing. Agents may activate subagents dynamically and recursively. The development of Joyce formed the foundation of the language SuperPascal, also developed by Hansen around 1993.

== Features ==
Joyce is based on a small subset of Pascal, extended with features inspired from CSP for concurrency. The following sections describe some of the more novel features that were introduced.

=== Agents ===
An agent is a procedure consisting of a set of statements and possibly nested definitions of other agents. An agent may dynamically activate subagents which execute concurrently with their creator. An agent can terminate only when all of its subagents have also terminated. For example, an agent process2 activates process1:

agent process1(x, y: integer);
begin
    ...
end;

agent process2();
use process1;
begin
    process1(9, 17);
end;

The activation of an agent creates new instances of all local variables and the value of each formal parameter is copied to a local variable. Hence, agents cannot access variables of other agents and are allowed only to communicate through the use of channels. This restriction prevents problems associated with the use of shared variables such as race conditions.

=== Communication ===
Agents communicate through entities called channels. Channels have an alphabet, defining the set of symbols which may be transmitted. Channels are created dynamically and accessed through the use of port variables. A port type is defined by a distinct set of symbols constituting its alphabet. Symbols with multiple values are defined with a specific type. For example:

stream = [int(integer), eos];

The symbol int(integer) denotes a message symbol called int of any integer value. The second typeless symbol declaration eos (end of stream) is named a signal. Once a port type has been defined, a port variable of that type can be declared:

out : stream
in  : stream

And then a channel entity, internal to the agent creating it, can be activated as follows:

+out;

Symbols can then be sent and received on channels using the CSP-style input and output operators ? and ! respectively. A communication can occur only if there is a receiving agent matching the sending agent. The receiving agent must expect to receive the symbol type being sent. For example, the value 9 followed by the eos symbol is sent on port out:

out ! int(9)
out ! eos

And an integer message is received into a variable of a matching type, followed by the eos:

received : integer
in ? int(received)
in ? eos

=== Polling statements ===
Polling statements are based the CSP concept of guarded alternatives. A polling statement is made up of a set of statements, each guarded by an input channel statement. When a communication is matched between a transmitting agent and a guard, the guard is executed, followed by the corresponding statement. For example:

poll
    in ? X -> x := x + 1 |
    in ? Y -> y := y + 1
end

Where the port in is monitored for the signals X or Y, on a matching communication, the corresponding variables x or y are incremented.

=== Security ===
Joyce was designed to be a secure language in the sense that a compiler would be able to detect all violations of the language rules.

== Example program ==
The following is a complete example program, taken from the original paper introducing the Joyce programming language, implementing an algorithm to generate prime numbers based on a sieving technique for generation of primes. A sieve agent is sent a stream of integers from its predecessor, the first being a prime. It removes all multiples of this prime from the stream and activates a successor. This continues until the eos signal is propagated along the set of sieves.

agent sieve(inp, out: stream);
var more: boolean; x, y: integer;
  succ: stream;
begin
    poll
        inp?int(x) -> +succ; 
            sieve(succ, out); more := true |
        inp?eos    -> out!eos; more := false
    end;
    while more do
        poll
            inp?int(y) ->
                if y mod x <> 0 then succ!int(y) |
            inp?eos    -> out!int(x);
                succ!eos; more := false
        end;
end;

The following agent initialises the set of sieve agents and inputs into them a stream of integers between 3 and 9999.

agent primes;
use generate, sieve, print;
var a, b: stream;
begin
    +a; +b; generate(a, 3, 2, 4999);
    sieve(a, b); print(b)
end;

== Implementation ==
=== Stack allocation ===
Due to concurrent execution of agent procedures, a conventional sequential stack allocation scheme cannot be used as the activation records of the agent calls do not follow a last-in first-out pattern. Instead, the creator-subagent relationships form a tree-structured stack. A simple scheme is used to implement this behaviour, which works by allocating new activation records at the top of the stack, and linking subagents' activation records to their creator's record. These records are freed only when the agent has terminated and they are at the top of the stack. The effectiveness of this scheme depends on the structure and behaviour of a program, which in some cases will result in poor memory use. A more effective scheme was implemented in Hansen's language SuperPascal.
