= Regnecentralen =

Logo of Regnecentralen

Regnecentralen (RC) was the first Danish computer company, founded on 12 October 1955. Through the 1950s and 1960s, they designed a series of computers, originally for their own use, and later to be sold commercially. Descendants of these systems sold well into the 1980s. They also developed a series of high-speed paper tape machines, and produced Data General Nova machines under license.

== Genesis ==
What would become RC began as an advisory board formed by the Danish Akademiet for de Tekniske Videnskaber (Academy of Applied Sciences) to keep abreast of developments in modern electronic computing devices taking place in other countries. It was originally named Regnecentralen, Dansk Institut for Matematikmaskiner (Danish Institute of Computing Machinery) After several years in the advisory role, in 1952 they decided to form a computing service bureau for Danish government, military and research uses. Led by Niels Ivar Bech, the group was also given the details of the BESK machine being designed at the Swedish Mathematical Center (Matematikmaskinnämndens Arbetsgrupp).

The group decided to build their own version of the BESK to run the bureau, and formed Regnecentralen in October 1955 to complete and run the machine. The result was the DASK, a vacuum tube-based machine that completed construction in 1956 and went into full operation in February 1957. DASK was followed in 1961 by the fully transistorized GIER, used for similar tasks. GIER is an acronym for "Geodætisk Instituts Elektroniske Regnemaskine" (Institute of Geodetics Electronic Calculator) and was introduced there on 14 September 1961. GIER proved to be a useful machine, and went on to be used at many Danish universities. Bech also sold GIER machines to the Eastern Bloc nations, starting with Czechoslovakia, Hungary, Poland and Bulgaria, and later Romania, the East Germany, and Yugoslavia.

RC was also home to Peter Naur, and DASK and GIER became well known for their role in the development of the famous programming language ALGOL. After the first European ALGOL conference in 1959, RC began an effort to produce a series of compilers, completing one for the DASK in September 1961. A version for the GIER followed in August 1962. Christian Andersen and Peter Schyum Poulsen, another RC employee, wrote the first introductory text on the language, Everyman's Desk ALGOL, in 1961.

== Peripheral business ==
To support higher throughput at their own service bureau, RC developed several high-speed input/output devices. One of their most popular was the RC 2000 paper tape reader, introduced in 1963. Feeding the tape at 5 meters per second, the 2000 could read 2,000 characters per second (CPS), storing the results in a buffer while the computer periodically read the data back out instead of stopping the tape to wait for the computer to get ready. The machine was later upgraded as the RC 2500, increasing speed to almost 7 meters a second, improving read speed to 2500 CPS. The RC 2000/2500 became a major product for RC during the 1960s, selling 1,500 examples around the world. Several related devices were added to the line, including a high-speed punch and a dedicated data conversion machine that would "massage" data between formats to ease the burden on the host computer.

In 1964 Regnecentralen was taken public. Most of the firm's shares were held by its biggest customers.

== New computers ==
In the mid-1960s, RC began the design of a small integrated circuit-based computer system for industrial control and automation needs, initially to fill a request by a Danish company to automate a chemical factory they were building in Poland. The RC 4000 design emerged in 1966 and was completed for the factory the next year. When combined with appropriate peripherals, almost always including an RC 2000 along with several rebranded devices from other companies, the RC 4000 was a highly reliable minicomputer, and went on to be sold across Europe. The RC 8000 from the mid-1970s used newer-generation integrated circuits (ICs) to shrink the RC 4000 into a single rack-mount system. The last in the series, the RC 9000, further shrunk the machine and improved performance to about 4 MIPS, and was sold in versions that could run either RC 8000 programs, or Unix.

The RC 4000 is famous for its operating system, developed by Per Brinch Hansen. Known as the RC 4000 multiprogramming system, it is the first real-world example of a system using a very simple kernel along with a variety of user-selected programs that built up the system as a whole. Today this concept is known as a microkernel, and efforts to correct for microkernels' poor performance formed the basis of most OS research through the 1970s and 1980s. Brinch Hansen also worked with Charles Simonyi and Peter Kraft on the RC 4000's Real-time Control System.

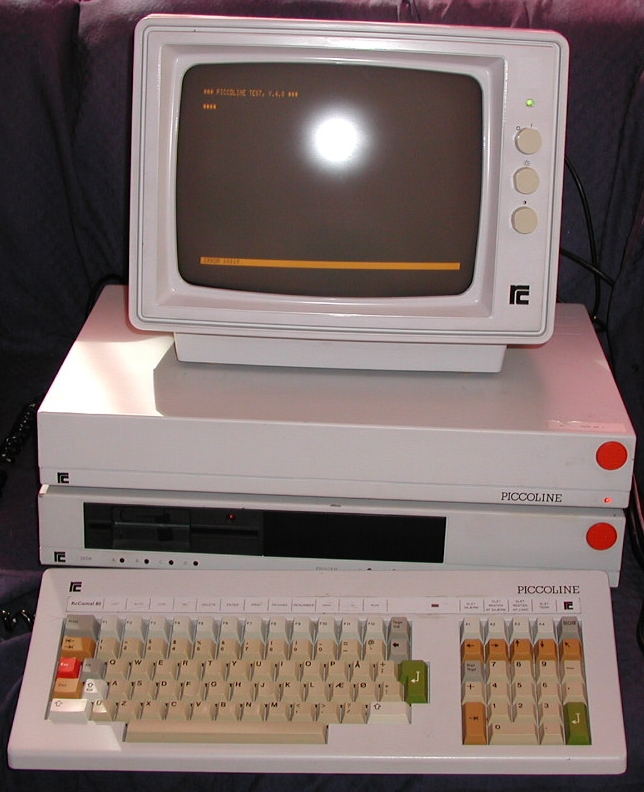
A Regnecentralen RC-759 Piccoline, with floppy disk drive, photographed by Thomas Hillebrandt

RC also began selling the Data General Nova under license in 1970 as the RC 7000, later introducing their own updated version as the RC 3600 the next year. This series filled a niche similar to the RC 4000, but for much smaller installations. The RC 3600 became a fixture of many Danish schools and universities.

During the 1980s, RC produced the RC700 Piccolo, the RC750 Partner, and the RC759 Piccoline systems, which were sold to Danish schools mostly, and to some businesses in Denmark and abroad. The Piccolo was powered by the Zilog Z80A CPU, while the Piccoline was powered by the Intel 80186 processor.

In 1988, International Computers Limited (ICL) acquired a 50% stake in Regnecentralen, then trading as RC Computer, with the intention of merging the business into ICL Denmark. However, the business persisted as a distinct operational entity under the RC International name.
