= List of programming languages by type =

List of programming languages types and the languages that meet its description

The notable programming languages listed here are grouped by their notable language attribute. As a language can have multiple attributes, the same language can appear in multiple groupings.

== Agent-oriented programming languages ==
Agent-oriented programming allows the developer to build, extend and use software agents, which are abstractions of objects that can message other agents.

- Clojure
- F#
- GOAL
- SARL

== Array languages ==
Array programming (also termed vector or multidimensional) languages generalize operations on scalars to apply transparently to vectors, matrices, and higher-dimensional arrays.

- A+
- Ada
- Analytica
- APL
- Chapel
- Dartmouth BASIC
- Fortran (As of Fortran 90)
- FreeMat
- GAUSS
- Interactive Data Language (IDL)
- J
- Julia
- K
- MATLAB
- Octave
- PL/I
- Q
- R
- Raku
- S
- Scilab
- S-Lang
- SequenceL
- Speakeasy
- Wolfram Mathematica (Wolfram language)
- X10
- ZPL

== Aspect-oriented programming languages ==
Aspect-oriented programming enables developers to add new functions to code, known as advice, without modifying that code. Instead, it uses a pointcut to implement the advice into code blocks.

- Ada
- AspectJ
- Groovy
- Nemerle
- Raku

== Assembly languages ==
Assembly languages directly correspond to a machine language (see below), so machine code instructions appear in a form understandable by humans, although there may not be a one-to-one mapping between an individual statement and an individual instruction. Assembly languages let programmers use symbolic addresses, which the assembler converts to absolute or relocatable addresses. Most assemblers also support macros and symbolic constants.

== Authoring languages ==
An authoring language is a programming language designed for use by a non-computer expert to easily create tutorials, websites, and other interactive computer programs.

- Lasso
- PILOT
- TUTOR
- Authorware

== Command-line interface languages ==
Command-line interface (CLI) languages are also called batch languages or job control languages. Examples:

- 4DOS
- 4OS2
- Batch files for DOS and Windows
  - COMMAND.COM
  - cmd.exe
- sh
  - ksh
  - bash
  - zsh
- CLIST (MVS Command List)
- CMS EXEC
- csh
  - tcsh
  - Hamilton C shell
- DIGITAL Command Language
- EXEC 2
- Expect
- fish
- Nushell
- Windows PowerShell
- rc
- Rexx
- TACL (programming language)

== Compiled languages ==
These are languages typically processed by compilers, though theoretically any language can be compiled or interpreted.

- ArkTS
- ActionScript
- Ada
- ALGOL 58
  - JOVIAL
  - NELIAC
- ALGOL 60
  - SMALL
- ALGOL 68
- Ballerina (bytecode runtime)
- BASIC
- BCPL
- C
- C++
- C# (into CIL runtime)
- Ceylon (into JVM bytecode)
- CHILL
- Clipper 5.3
- CLEO for Leo computers
- Clojure (into JVM bytecode)
- COBOL
- Cobra
- Common Lisp
- Crystal
- Curl
- D
- DASL→Java, JavaScript (JS), JSP, Flex.war
- Delphi (Borland's Object Pascal development system)
- DIBOL
- Dylan
- Eiffel
  - Sather
  - Ubercode
- Elm
- Emacs Lisp
- Emerald
- Erlang
- Factor
- Fortran
- GAUSS
- Go
- Gosu (into JVM bytecode)
- Groovy (into JVM bytecode)
- Haskell
- Harbour
- HolyC
- Inform (usually story files for Glulx or Z-code)
- Java
- JOVIAL
- Julia
- Kotlin
- LabVIEW
- Mercury
- Mesa
- Nemerle (into intermediate language bytecode)
- Nim
- Objective-C
- P
- Pascal
- PL/I
- Plus
- Pony
- Python (to intermediate VM bytecode)
- RPG (Report Program Generator)
- Red
- Rust
- Scala (into JVM bytecode))
- Scheme (e.g. Gambit)
- SequenceL
- Simula
- Smalltalk platform independent VM bytecode
- Swift
- ML
  - Standard ML
    - Alice
  - OCaml
  - F# (into CIL, generates runtime)
- Turing
- V (Vlang)
- Vala
- Visual Basic (CIL JIT runtime)
- Visual FoxPro
- Visual Prolog
- Xojo
- Zig

== Concatenative programming languages ==
A concatenative programming language is a point-free computer programming language in which all expressions denote functions, and the juxtaposition of expressions denotes function composition.

- Factor
- Forth
- jq (function application is also supported)
- Joy
- PostScript
- Raku

== Concurrent languages ==
Message passing languages provide language constructs for concurrency. The predominant paradigm for concurrency in mainstream languages such as Java is shared memory concurrency. Concurrent languages that make use of message passing have generally been inspired by process calculi such as communicating sequential processes (CSP) or the π-calculus.

- Ada
- Alef
- Ateji PX
- Ballerina
- C++ (since C++11)
- ChucK
- Cilk
- Cω (through asynchronous communication)
- Clojure
- Chapel
- Co-array Fortran
- Concurrent Pascal
- Curry
- D
- E
- Eiffel (through the SCOOP mechanism, Simple Concurrent Object-Oriented Computation)
- Elixir
- Emerald (through threads and monitors)
- Erlang (through asynchronous message passing with nothing shared)
- Gambit Scheme (using the Termite library)
- Gleam
- Go
- Haskell (through concurrent, distributed, and parallel programming across multiple machines)
- Java
  - Join Java
  - X10
- Julia
- Joule (through message passing)
- LabVIEW
- Limbo
- MultiLisp (through extended parallelism capabilities)
- OCaml
- occam
  - occam-π
- Orc
- Oz (through shared-state and message-passing concurrency, and futures, and Mozart Programming System cross-platform Oz)
- P
- Pony
- Pict
- Python (through thread-based parallelism and process-based parallelism)
- Raku
- Rust
- Scala
- SequenceL
- SR
- V (Vlang)
- Unified Parallel C
- XProc

== Constraint programming languages ==
A constraint programming language is a declarative programming language where relationships between variables are expressed as constraints. Execution proceeds by attempting to find values for the variables which satisfy all declared constraints.

- Claire
- Constraint Handling Rules
- CHIP
- ECLiPSe
- Kaleidoscope
- Oz
- Raku

== Contract languages ==
Design by contract (or contract programming) is programming using defined preconditions, postconditions, and invariants.

- Ada (since Ada 2012)
- Ciao
- Clojure
- Cobra
- C++ (since C++26)
- D
- Dafny
- Eiffel
- Fortress
- Kotlin
- Mercury
- Oxygene (formerly Chrome and Delphi Prism)
- Racket (including higher order contracts, and emphasizing that contract violations must blame the guilty party and must do so with an accurate explanation)
- Sather
- Scala
- SPARK (via static analysis of Ada programs)
- Vala
- Vienna Development Method (VDM)

== Curly bracket languages ==
A curly bracket or curly brace language has syntax that defines a block as the statements between curly brackets, a.k.a. braces, {}. This syntax originated with BCPL (1966), and was popularized by C. Many curly bracket languages descend from or are strongly influenced by C.

- ABCL/c+
- Alef
- AWK
- ArkTS
- B
- bc
- BCPL
- Ballerina
- C
- C++
- HolyC
- C#
- Ceylon
- Chapel
- ChucK
- Cilk
- Cyclone
- D
- Dart
- DASL – based on Java
- E
- ECMAScript
  - AssemblyScript
  - ActionScript
  - ECMAScript for XML
  - JavaScript
  - JScript
  - TypeScript
- GLSL
- Go
- HLSL
- Java
  - Processing
  - Groovy
  - Join Java
  - Kotlin
  - Tea
  - X10
- Limbo
- LPC
- MEL
- Nemerle (curly braces optional)
- Objective-C
- PCASTL
- Perl
- PHP
- Pico
- Pike
- PowerShell
- R
- Raku
- Rust
- S-Lang
- Scala (curly-braces optional)
- sed
- Solidity
- SuperCollider
- Swift
- Tcl
- UnrealScript
- V (Vlang)
- Yorick
- YASS
- Zig

== Dataflow languages ==
Dataflow programming languages rely on a (usually visual) representation of the flow of data to specify the program. Often used to react to discrete events or to process streams of data. Dataflow languages include:

- Analytica
- Ballerina
- Binary Modular Dataflow Machine (BMDFM)
- CMS Pipelines
- G (used in LabVIEW)
- Lucid
- Max
- Oz
- Prograph
- Pure Data
- Reaktor
- StreamBase StreamSQL EventFlow
- Swift (parallel scripting language)
- VEE
- VHDL
- VisSim
- Vvvv
- WebMethods Flow

== Data-oriented languages ==
Data-oriented languages provide powerful ways to search and manipulate the relations that have been described as entity relationship tables, which map one set of things into other sets. Data-oriented languages include:

- Associative Programming Language
- Clarion
- Clipper
- dBase
- Gremlin
- MUMPS
- Caché ObjectScript
- RETRIEVE
- RDQL
- SPARQL
- SQL
- Visual FoxPro
- Wolfram Mathematica (Wolfram language)

== Decision table languages ==
Decision tables can be used as an aid to clarifying the logic before writing a program in any language, but in the 1960s a number of languages were developed where the main logic is expressed directly in the form of a decision table, including:

- Filetab

== Declarative languages ==
Declarative languages express the logic of a computation without describing its control flow in detail. Declarative programming stands in contrast to imperative programming via imperative programming languages, where control flow is specified by serial orders (imperatives). (Pure) functional and logic-based programming languages are also declarative, and constitute the major subcategories of the declarative category. This section lists additional examples not in those subcategories.

- Analytica
- Ant (combine declarative programming and imperative programming)
- Curry
- Cypher
- Datalog
- Distributed Application Specification Language (DASL) (combine declarative programming and imperative programming)
- ECL
- Gremlin
- Inform (combine declarative programming and imperative programming)
- Lustre
- Mercury
- Metafont
- MetaPost
- Modelica
- Nix
- Prolog
- QML
- Oz
- RDQL
- SequenceL
- SPARQL
- SQL (Only DQL, not DDL, DCL, and DML)
- Soufflé
- VHDL (supports declarative programming, imperative programming, and functional programming)
- Wolfram Mathematica (Wolfram language)
- WOQL (TerminusDB)
- xBase
- XSL Transformations

== Embeddable languages ==
=== In source code ===
Source embeddable languages embed small pieces of executable code inside a piece of free-form text, often a web page.

Client-side embedded languages are limited by the abilities of the browser or intended client. They aim to provide dynamism to web pages without the need to recontact the server.

Server-side embedded languages are much more flexible, since almost any language can be built into a server. The aim of having fragments of server-side code embedded in a web page is to generate additional markup dynamically; the code itself disappears when the page is served, to be replaced by its output.

==== Server side ====
- PHP
- VBScript
- Tcl – server-side in NaviServer and an essential component in electronics industry systems

The above examples are particularly dedicated to this purpose. A large number of other languages, such as Erlang, Scala, Perl and Ruby can be adapted (for instance, by being made into Apache modules).

==== Client side ====
- ActionScript
- JavaScript
- VBScript (Windows only)

=== In object code ===
A wide variety of dynamic or scripting languages can be embedded in compiled executable code. Basically, object code for the language's interpreter needs to be linked into the executable. Source code fragments for the embedded language can then be passed to an evaluation function as strings. Application control languages can be implemented this way, if the source code is input by the user. Languages with small interpreters are preferred.

- AngelScript
- Ch
- EEL
- Io
- jq (C and Go)
- Julia
- Lua
- Luau
- Python
- Ruby (via mruby)
- Squirrel
- Tcl

== Educational programming languages ==
Languages developed primarily for the purpose of teaching and learning of programming.

- Alice
- Blockly
- Catrobat
- COMAL
- Elan
- Emerald
- Ezhil
- Hedy
- Logo
- Modula-2
- Pascal
- PL/C
- Racket
- Scheme
- Scratch
- Snap!
- SP/k
- Turing
- Wolfram Mathematica (Wolfram language)

== Esoteric languages ==
An esoteric programming language is a programming language designed as a test of the boundaries of computer programming language design, as a proof of concept, or as a joke.

- Beatnik
- Befunge
- Brainfuck
- Chef
- INTERCAL
- LOLCODE
- Malbolge
- Piet
- Shakespeare
- Whitespace
- BracketLang

== Extension languages ==
Extension programming languages are languages embedded into another program and used to harness its features in extension scripts.

- AutoLISP (specific to AutoCAD)
- BeanShell
- CAL
- C/AL (C/SIDE)
- Guile
- Emacs Lisp
- JavaScript and some dialects, e.g., JScript
- Lua (embedded in many games)
- OpenCL (extension of C and C++ to use the GPU and parallel extensions of the CPU)
- OptimJ (extension of Java with language support for writing optimization models and powerful abstractions for bulk data processing)
- Perl
- Pike
- PowerShell
- Python (embedded in Maya, Blender, and other 3D animation packages)
- Rexx
- Ruby (Google SketchUp)
- S-Lang
- SQL
- Squirrel
- Tcl
- Vim script
- Visual Basic for Applications

== Fourth-generation languages ==
Fourth-generation programming languages are high-level programming languages built around database systems. They are generally used in commercial environments.

- 1C:Enterprise programming language
- ABAP
- CorVision
- CSC's GraphTalk
- CA-IDEAL (Interactive Development Environment for an Application Life) for use with CA-DATACOM/DB
- Easytrieve report generator (now CA-Easytrieve Plus)
- FOCUS
- IBM Informix-4GL
- LINC 4GL
- LiveCode (Not based on a database; still, the goal is to work at a higher level of abstraction than 3GLs.)
- MAPPER (Unisys/Sperry) (now part of BIS)
- MARK-IV (Sterling/Informatics) now VISION:BUILDER of CA
- NATURAL
- Progress 4GL
- PV-Wave
- RETRIEVE
- SAS
- SQL
- Ubercode (VHLL, or Very-High-Level Language)
- Uniface
- Visual DataFlex
- Visual FoxPro
- xBase

== Functional languages ==
Functional programming languages define programs and subroutines as mathematical functions and treat them as first-class. Many so-called functional languages are "impure", containing imperative features. Many functional languages are tied to mathematical calculation tools. Functional languages include:

=== Pure ===
- Agda
- Clean
- Cuneiform
- Curry
- Elm
- Futhark
- Haskell
- Hope
- Idris
- Joy
- jq (functions are 2nd class)
- KRC
- Lean
- Mercury
- Miranda
- Pure
- PureScript
- Rocq
- SAC
- SASL
- SequenceL
- Ur

=== Impure ===
- APL
  - J
  - Q (programming language from Kx Systems)
- ATS
- CAL
- C++ (since C++11)
- C#
- VB.NET
- Ceylon
- Curl
- D
- Dart
- ECMAScript
  - ActionScript
  - ECMAScript for XML
  - JavaScript
  - JScript
  - Source
  - ArkTS
  - TypeScript
- Erlang
  - Elixir
  - Gleam
  - LFE
- Fexl
- Flix
- G (used in LabVIEW)
- Groovy
- Hop
- Java (since version 8)
- Julia
- Kotlin
- Lisp
  - Clojure
  - Common Lisp
  - Dylan
  - Emacs Lisp
  - LFE
  - Little b
  - Logo
  - Racket
  - Scheme
    - Guile
  - Tea
- ML
  - Standard ML
    - Alice
  - OCaml
  - F#
- Nemerle
- Nim
- Opal
- OpenSCAD
- OPS5
- Perl
  - Raku
- PHP
- PL/pgSQL
- Python
- Q (equational programming language)
- R
- Rebol
- Red
- Ruby
- REFAL
- Rust
- Scala
- Swift
- Spreadsheets
- V (Vlang)
- Tcl
- Wolfram Mathematica (Wolfram language)

== Hardware description languages ==
In electronics, a hardware description language (HDL) is a specialized computer language used to describe the structure, design, and operation of electronic circuits, and most commonly, digital logic circuits. The two most widely used and well-supported HDL varieties used in industry are Verilog and VHDL. Hardware description languages include:

=== HDLs for analog circuit design ===
- Verilog-AMS (Verilog for Analog and Mixed-Signal)
- VHDL-AMS (VHDL with Analog/Mixed-Signal extension)

=== HDLs for digital circuit design ===
- Advanced Boolean Expression Language
- Altera Hardware Description Language
- Bluespec
- Confluence
- ELLA
- Handel-C
- Impulse C
- Lola
- MyHDL
- PALASM
- Ruby (hardware description language)
- SystemC
- SystemVerilog
- Verilog
- VHDL (VHSIC HDL)

== Imperative languages ==
Imperative programming languages may be multi-paradigm and appear in other classifications. Here is a list of programming languages that follow the imperative paradigm:

- Ada
- ALGOL 58
  - JOVIAL
  - NELIAC
- ALGOL 60 (very influential language design)
- ALGOL 68
- Assembly languages
- BASIC
- C
- C++
- C#
- Ceylon
- CHILL
- COBOL
- D
- Dart
- ECMAScript
  - ActionScript
  - ECMAScript for XML
  - JavaScript
  - JScript
  - Source
- FORTRAN
- GAUSS
- Go
- Groovy
- Icon
- Java
- Julia
- Lua
- MATLAB
- Machine languages
- Modula-2, Modula-3
- MUMPS
- Nim
- OCaml
- Oberon
- Object Pascal
- Open Object Rexx (ooRexx)
- Open Programming Language (OPL)
- OpenEdge Advanced Business Language (ABL)
- Pascal
- Perl
- PHP
- PL/I
- PL/S
- PowerShell
- PROSE
- Python
- Raku
- Rexx
- Ruby
- Rust
- SETL
- Speakeasy
- Swift
- Tcl
- V (Vlang)
- Wolfram Mathematica (Wolfram language)

== Interactive mode languages ==
Known as REPL - Interactive mode languages act as a kind of shell: expressions or statements can be entered one at a time, and the result of their evaluation seen immediately.

- APL
- BASIC (some dialects)
- Clojure
- Common Lisp
- Dart (with Observatory or Dartium's developer tools)
- ECMAScript
  - ActionScript
  - ECMAScript for XML
  - JavaScript
  - JScript
  - Source
  - ArkTS
- Erlang
- Elixir (with iex)
- F#
- Fril
- GAUSS
- Groovy
- Guile
- Haskell (with the GHCi or Hugs interpreter)
- IDL
- J
- Java (since version 9)
- Julia
- Lua
- MUMPS (an ANSI standard general-purpose language)
- Maple
- MATLAB
- ML
- Nim (with INim)
- OCaml
- Perl
- PHP
- Pike
- PostScript
- PowerShell (.NET-based CLI)
- Prolog
- Python
- PROSE
- R
- Raku
- Rebol
- Red
- Rexx
- Ruby (with IRB)
- Scala
- Scheme
- Smalltalk (anywhere in a Smalltalk environment)
- S-Lang (with the S-Lang shell, slsh)
- Speakeasy
- Swift
- Tcl (with the Tcl shell, tclsh)
- Unix shell
- Visual FoxPro
- Wolfram Mathematica (Wolfram language)

== Interpreted languages ==
Interpreted languages are programming languages in which programs may be executed from source code form, by an interpreter. Theoretically, any language can be compiled or interpreted, so the term interpreted language generally refers to languages that are usually interpreted rather than compiled.

- Ant
- APL
- AutoHotkey
- AutoIt
- BASIC (some dialects)
- Programming Language for Business (PL/B, formerly DATABUS, later versions added optional compiling)
- Eiffel (via Melting Ice Technology in EiffelStudio)
- Emacs Lisp
- FOCAL
- GameMaker Language
- Groovy
- J
- jq
- Java via JVM bytecode
- Julia (compiled on the fly to machine code, by default, interpreting also available)
- JavaScript
- Lisp (early versions, pre-1962, and some experimental ones; production Lisp systems are compilers, but many of them still provide an interpreter if needed)
- LPC
- Lua
- MUMPS (an ANSI standard general-purpose language)
- Maple
- MATLAB
- OCaml
- Pascal (early implementations)
- PCASTL
- Perl
- PHP
- PostScript
- PowerShell
- PROSE
- Python
- Rexx
- R
- Raku
- Rebol
- Red
- Ruby
- S-Lang
- Seed7
- Speakeasy
- Standard ML
- Spin
- Tcl
- Tea
- TorqueScript
- VBScript
- Windows PowerShell – .NET-based CLI
- Some scripting languages – below
- Wolfram Mathematica (Wolfram language)

== Iterative languages ==
Iterative languages offer and/or are built around generators.

- Aldor
- Alphard
- C++
- C#
- CLU
- Cobra
- D
- ECMAScript (ES6+)
- Eiffel, through "agents"
- Icon
- IPL-v
- jq
- Julia (has iterators and generators)
- Lua
- Nim
- PHP
- Python
- Raku
- Sather

== Languages by memory management type ==
=== Garbage collected languages ===
Garbage Collection (GC) is a form of automatic memory management. The garbage collector attempts to reclaim memory that was allocated by the program but is no longer used.

- APL
- C, through unofficial garbage collectors such as Boehm
- C++ (supported in the standard library from C++11 until C++23)
- C#
- Clean
- Crystal
- D
- Dart
- ECMAScript
  - ActionScript
  - ECMAScript for XML
  - JavaScript
  - JScript
  - Source
- Emerald
- Erlang
- Go
- Groovy
- Haskell
- Java
- Julia
- Kotlin
- LabVIEW
- Lisp (originator)
  - Arc
  - Clojure
  - Common Lisp
  - Dylan
  - Emacs Lisp
  - Guile
  - Racket
  - Scheme
  - Logo
- Lua
- ML
  - Standard ML
    - Alice
  - OCaml
- Modula-3
- Perl
- PHP
- PowerShell
- Python
- Ruby
- Smalltalk
- Speakeasy

=== Languages with manual memory management ===
- ALGOL 68
- Assembly (various)
- BLISS
- C
- C++ (Note: An optional garbage collector was provided from C++11 until C++23.)
- Component Pascal
- D with -betterC compile flag
- Forth
- Fortran
- FreeBASIC
- Modula-2
- Oberon
- Pascal
- PL/I
- Zig

=== Languages with optional manual memory management ===
- Ada (Note: Some Ada implementations include a garbage collector, though the language specification does not require its inclusion.)
- Blitz BASIC
- C#, in unsafe contexts
- COBOL
- D
- Nim
- Objective-C
- Objective-C++
- PostScript (Note: Developers initially had to manually reclaim memory using the save and restore operators. PostScript Level 2 introduced a garbage collector, but its usage is optional.)
- Rust (Note: In unsafe contexts. Reference counting is also provided.)
- V
- Vala

Some programming languages without the inherent ability to manually manage memory, like Cython, Swift, (Note: On Apple platforms, these functions are imported from the C standard library (which is imported from Foundation, AppKit or UIKit); on Linux, the developer needs to import Glibc, and ucrt on Windows.) and Scala (Scala Native only), are able to import or call functions like malloc and free from C through a foreign function interface.

The Java programming language used to offer some degree of manual memory allocation through the internal sun.misc.Unsafe class. However, this class is now deprecated and will eventually be removed.

=== Languages with deterministic memory management ===
- Ada
- C
- C++
- D
- Fortran
- Nim
- Pascal
- Rust
- Objective-C
- Zig
- Modula-3

=== Languages with automatic reference counting (ARC) ===
- Nim
- Objective-C
- Perl
- Swift
- Visual Basic
- Xojo

== List-based languages – LISPs ==
List-based languages are a type of data-structured language that are based on the list data structure.

- Lisp
  - Arc
  - Clojure
  - Common Lisp
  - Dylan
  - Emacs Lisp
  - Guile
  - Racket
  - Scheme
  - Logo
  - Hy
- Joy
- R
- Source
- Tcl
  - Tea
- TRAC

== Little languages ==
Little languages serve a specialized problem domain.

- awk – used for text file manipulation.
- sed – parses and transforms text
- SQL – has only a few keywords and not all the constructs needed for a full programming language (Note: The objects of SQL are collections of database records, called tables. A full programming language can specify algorithms, irrespective of runtime. Thus an algorithm can be considered to generate usable results. In contrast, SQL can only select records that are limited to the current collection, the data at hand in the system, rather than produce a statement of the correctness of the result.) – many database management systems extend SQL with additional constructs as a stored procedure language
- XPL - a language designed for, although not limited to, compiler writing

== Logic-based languages ==
Logic-based languages specify a set of attributes that a solution must-have, rather than a set of steps to obtain a solution.

Notable languages following this programming paradigm include:

- ALF
- Alma-0
- Curry
- Datalog
- Fril
- Flix (a functional programming language with first-class Datalog constraints)
- Janus
- λProlog
- Oz, and Mozart Programming System cross-platform Oz
- Prolog (formulates data and the program evaluation mechanism as a special form of mathematical logic called Horn logic and a general proving mechanism called logical resolution)
  - Mercury (based on Prolog)
  - Visual Prolog (object-oriented Prolog extension)
- Soufflé

== Machine languages ==
Machine languages are directly executable by a computer's CPU. They are typically formulated as bit patterns, usually represented in octal or hexadecimal. Each bit pattern causes the circuits in the CPU to execute one of the fundamental operations of the hardware. The activation of specific electrical inputs (e.g., CPU package pins for microprocessors), and logical settings for CPU state values, control the processor's computation. Individual machine languages are specific to a family of processors; machine-language code for one family of processors cannot run directly on processors in another family unless the processors in question have additional hardware to support it (for example, DEC VAX processors included a PDP-11 compatibility mode). They are (essentially) always defined by the CPU developer, not by 3rd parties. (Note: A notable exception would be the Soviet/Russian 1801 series CPU, which originally used their own domestic ISA, but were later redesigned to be PDP-11 compatible as a policy decision.) The symbolic version, the processor's assembly language, is also defined by the developer, in most cases. Some commonly used machine code instruction sets are:

- ARM
  - Original 32-bit
  - 16-bit Thumb instructions (subset of registers used)
  - 64-bit (major architecture change)
- Burroughs Corporation
  - Burroughs B5000 instruction set
  - Burroughs B6x00-7x00 instruction set
- DEC:
  - 18-bit: PDP-1, PDP-4/PDP-7/PDP-9/PDP-15
  - 12-bit: PDP-5/PDP-8/LINC-8/PDP-12
  - 36-bit: PDP-6/PDP-10/DECSYSTEM-20
  - 16-bit: PDP-11 (influenced VAX and M68000)
  - 32-bit: VAX
  - 64-bit: Alpha
- Hewlett-Packard
  - HP 2100 series (16-bit)
  - HP 3000 "Classic" series (16-bit)
  - PA-RISC (32-bit and 64-bit)
- IBM (Note: Submodels are not listed, only base models.)
  - 305
  - 650
  - 701
  - 702, 705 and 7080
  - 704, 709, 7040, 7044, 7090, 7094
  - 1400 series, 7010
  - 7030
  - 7070, 7072, 7074
  - System/360 and successors, including z/Architecture
- Intel 8008, 8080 and 8085
  - Zilog Z80
- Intel x86:
  - 16-bit x86, first used in the Intel 8086
    - Intel 8086 and 8088 (the latter was used in the first and early IBM PC)
    - Intel 80186
    - Intel 80286 (the first x86 processor with protected mode, used in the IBM PC AT)
  - IA-32, introduced in the 80386
  - x86-64 – The original specification was created by AMD. There are vendor variants, but they're essentially the same:
    - AMD's AMD64
    - Intel's Intel 64
- MCST Elbrus 2000
- MIPS
- MOS Technology 65xx (8-bit)
  - 6502 (CPU for NES, VIC-20, BBC Micro, Apple II, and Atari 8-bit computers)
  - 6510 (CPU for Commodore 64)
  - Western Design Center 65816/65802 (CPU for Apple IIGS and (variant) Super Nintendo Entertainment System)
- Motorola 6800 (8-bit)
- Motorola 68000 series (CPUs used in early Macintosh and early Sun computers)
- National Semiconductor NS320xx
- POWER, first used in the IBM RS/6000
  - PowerPC – used in Power Macintosh and in many game consoles, particularly of the seventh generation.
  - Power ISA – an evolution of PowerPC.
- RISC-V
- Sun Microsystems (now Oracle) SPARC
- UNIVAC
  - 30-bit computers: 490, 492, 494, 1230
  - 36-bit computers
    - 1101, 1103, 1105
    - 1100/2200 series

== Macro languages ==
=== Textual substitution macro languages ===
Macro languages transform one source code file into another. A "macro" is essentially a short piece of text that expands into a longer one (not to be confused with hygienic macros), possibly with parameter substitution. They are often used to preprocess source code. Preprocessors can also supply facilities like file inclusion.

Macro languages may be restricted to acting on specially labeled code regions (pre-fixed with a # in the case of the C preprocessor). Alternatively, they may not, but in this case it is still often undesirable to (for instance) expand a macro embedded in a string literal, so they still need a rudimentary awareness of syntax. That being the case, they are often still applicable to more than one language. Contrast with source-embeddable languages like PHP, which are fully featured.

- C preprocessor
- m4 (originally from AT&T, bundled with Unix)
- ML/I (general-purpose macro processor)
- TTM (developed at the California Institute of Technology)

=== Application macro languages ===
Scripting languages such as Tcl and ECMAScript (ActionScript, ECMAScript for XML, JavaScript, JScript) have been embedded into applications. These are sometimes called "macro languages", although in a somewhat different sense to textual-substitution macros like m4.

== Metaprogramming languages ==
Metaprogramming is the writing of programs that write or manipulate other programs, including themselves, as their data or that do part of the work that is otherwise done at run time during compile time. In many cases, this allows programmers to get more done in the same amount of time as they would take to write all the code manually.

- C++
- CWIC
- Curl
- D
- Emacs Lisp
- Elixir
- F#
- Groovy
- Haskell
- Julia
- Lisp
- Lua
- Maude system
- META II (and META I, a subset)
- OCaml (MetaOCaml)
- Nemerle
- Nim
- Perl
- Python
- Raku
- Red
- Ruby
- Rust
- Scheme
- SequenceL
- Smalltalk
- Source
- TREE-META
- Wolfram Mathematica (Wolfram language)
- Zig

== Modular languages ==
Modular programming is a programming paradigm of organising functions and symbols into independent modules.

- Ada
- ALGOL
- BlitzMax
- C (mainly via the #include preprocessor directive, but also via Clang extensions)
- C++ (via C++ modules)
- C#
- Clojure
- COBOL
- Common Lisp
- D
- Dart
- eC
- Erlang
- Elixir
- Elm
- F
- F#
- Fortran
- Go
- Haskell
- IBM/360 Assembler
- IBM System/38 and AS/400 Control Language (CL)
- IBM RPG
- Java (via Java packages and Java modules)
- JavaScript
- Julia
- MATLAB
- ML
- Modula, Modula-2, Modula-3
- Morpho
- NEWP
- Oberon, Oberon-2
- Objective-C
- OCaml
- Pascal derivatives
  - Component Pascal
  - Object Pascal
  - Turbo Pascal
  - UCSD Pascal
- Perl
- PHP
- PL/I
- PureBasic
- Python
- R
- Ruby
- Rust
- Visual Basic (.NET)
- WebDNA.

== Multiparadigm languages ==
Multiparadigm languages support more than one programming paradigm. They allow a program to use more than one programming style. The goal is to allow programmers to use the best tool for a job, admitting that no one paradigm solves all problems in the easiest or most efficient way.

- 1C:Enterprise programming language (generic, imperative, object-oriented, prototype-based, functional)
- Ada (concurrent, distributed, generic (template metaprogramming), imperative, object-oriented (class-based))
- ALF (functional, logic)
- Alma-0 (constraint, imperative, logic)
- APL (functional, imperative, object-oriented (class-based))
- BETA (functional, imperative, object-oriented (class-based))
- C++ (generic, imperative, object-oriented (class-based), functional, metaprogramming)
- C# (generic, imperative, object-oriented (class-based), functional, declarative)
- Ceylon (generic, imperative, object-oriented (class-based), functional, declarative)
- ChucK (imperative, object-oriented, time-based, concurrent, on-the-fly)
- Cobra (generic, imperative, object-oriented (class-based), functional, contractual)
- Common Lisp (functional, imperative, object-oriented (class-based), aspect-oriented (user may add further paradigms, e.g., logic))
- Curl (functional, imperative, object-oriented (class-based), metaprogramming)
- Curry (concurrent, functional, logic)
- D (generic, imperative, functional, object-oriented (class-based), metaprogramming)
- Dart (generic, imperative, functional, object-oriented (class-based))
- Delphi Object Pascal (generic, imperative, object-oriented (class-based), metaprogramming)
- Dylan (functional, object-oriented (class-based))
- ECMAScript (functional, imperative, object-oriented (prototype-based))
  - ActionScript
  - ECMAScript for XML
  - JavaScript
  - JScript
- Eiffel (imperative, object-oriented (class-based), generic, functional (agents), concurrent (SCOOP))
- F# (functional, generic, object-oriented (class-based), language-oriented)
- Fantom (functional, object-oriented (class-based))
- Go (imperative, procedural),
- Groovy (functional, object-oriented (class-based), imperative, procedural)
- Harbour
- Hop
- J (functional, imperative, object-oriented (class-based))
- Java (generic, imperative, object-oriented (class-based), functional)
- Julia (imperative, multiple dispatch ("object-oriented"), functional, metaprogramming)
- LabVIEW (visual, dataflow, concurrent, modular, functional, object-oriented, scripting)
- Lua (functional, imperative, object-oriented (prototype-based))
- Mercury (functional, logical, object-oriented)
- Metaobject protocols (object-oriented (class-based, prototype-based))
- Nemerle (functional, object-oriented (class-based), imperative, metaprogramming)
- Objective-C (imperative, object-oriented (class-based), reflective)
- OCaml (functional, imperative, object-oriented (class-based), modular)
- Oz (functional (evaluation: eager, lazy), logic, constraint, imperative, object-oriented (class-based), concurrent, distributed), and Mozart Programming System cross-platform Oz
- Object Pascal (imperative, object-oriented (class-based))
- Perl (imperative, functional (can't be purely functional), object-oriented, class-oriented, aspect-oriented (through modules))
- PHP (imperative, object-oriented, functional (can't be purely functional))
- Pike (interpreted, general-purpose, high-level, cross-platform, dynamic programming language )
- Prograph (dataflow, object-oriented (class-based), visual)
- Python (functional, compiled, interpreted, object-oriented (class-based), imperative, metaprogramming, extension, impure, interactive mode, iterative, reflective, scripting)
- R (array, interpreted, impure, interactive mode, list-based, object-oriented prototype-based, scripting)
- Racket (functional, imperative, object-oriented (class-based) and can be extended by the user)
- Raku (concurrent, concatenative, functional, metaprogramming generic, imperative, reflection object-oriented, pipelines, reactive, and via libraries constraints, distributed)
- Rebol (functional, imperative, object-oriented (prototype-based), metaprogramming (dialected))
- Red (functional, imperative, object-oriented (prototype-based), metaprogramming (dialected))
- Ruby (imperative, functional, object-oriented (class-based), metaprogramming)
- Rust (concurrent, functional, imperative, object-oriented, generic, metaprogramming, compiled)
- Scala (functional, object-oriented)
- Seed7 (imperative, object-oriented, generic)
- SISAL (concurrent, dataflow, functional)
- Spreadsheets (functional, visual)
- Swift (protocol-oriented, object-oriented, functional, imperative, block-structured)
- Tcl (functional, imperative, object-oriented (class-based))
  - Tea (functional, imperative, object-oriented (class-based))
- V (Vlang) (functional, imperative, procedural, structured, concurrent)
- Windows PowerShell (functional, imperative, pipeline, object-oriented (class-based))
- Wolfram Mathematica (Wolfram language)

== Numerical analysis ==
Several general-purpose programming languages, such as C and Python, are also used for technical computing, this list focuses on languages almost exclusively used for technical computing.

- AIMMS
- AMPL
- Analytica
- Calcpad
- Fortran
- FreeMat
- Frink
- GAUSS
- GAMS
- GNU Data Language
- GNU Octave
- Interactive Data Language
- J
- Julia
- Klerer-May System
- Mathcad
- MATLAB
- MiniZinc
- O-Matrix
- OptimJ
- Ox
- PROSE
- R
- Seneca – an Oberon variant
- Scilab
- SequenceL
- Speakeasy
- Sysquake
- Wolfram Mathematica (Wolfram language)

== Non-English-based languages ==
- Chinese BASIC (Chinese)
- Fjölnir (Icelandic)
- Language Symbolique d'Enseignement (French)
- Rapira (Russian)
- ezhil (Tamil)

== Object-oriented class-based languages ==
Class-based object-oriented programming languages support objects defined by their class. Class definitions include member data. Message passing is a key concept, if not the main concept, in object-oriented languages.

Polymorphic functions parameterized by the class of some of their arguments are typically called methods. In languages with single dispatch, classes typically also include method definitions. In languages with multiple dispatch, methods are defined by generic functions. There are exceptions where single dispatch methods are generic functions (e.g. Bigloo's object system).

=== Multiple dispatch ===
- Common Lisp
- Cecil
- Dylan
- Julia (Note: The concept of object with the traditional single-dispatch OO semantics is not present in Julia, instead with the more general multiple dispatch on different types at runtime.)
- Raku

=== Single dispatch ===
- ActionScript 3.0
- Actor
- Ada 95, 2005 (multi-purpose language)
- APL
- BETA
- C++
- C#
- Ceylon
- Dart
- Oxygene (formerly named Chrome)
- ChucK
- Cobra
- ColdFusion
- Curl
- D
- Distributed Application Specification Language (DASL)
- Delphi Object Pascal
- E
- GNU E
- Eiffel
  - Sather
  - Ubercode
- Fortran 2003
- Fortress
- Gambas
- GameMaker Language (GML)
- Harbour
- J
- Java
  - Processing
  - Groovy
  - Join Java
  - Tea
  - X10
- LabVIEW
- Lua
- Modula-2 (data abstraction, information hiding, strong typing, full modularity)
  - Modula-3 (added more object-oriented features to Modula-2)
- Nemerle
- NetRexx
- Oberon-2 (full object-orientation equivalence in an original, strongly typed, Wirthian manner)
- Object Pascal
- Object REXX
- Objective-C (a superset of C adding a Smalltalk derived object model and message passing syntax)
- OCaml
- OpenEdge Advanced Business Language (ABL)
- Oz, Mozart Programming System
- Perl 5
- PHP
- Pike
- Prograph
- Python (interpretive language, optionally object-oriented)
- Revolution (programmer does not get to pick the objects)
- Ruby
- Scala
- Speakeasy
- Simula (first object-oriented language, developed by Ole-Johan Dahl and Kristen Nygaard)
- Smalltalk (pure object-orientation, developed at Xerox PARC)
  - Little Smalltalk
  - Pharo
  - Squeak
    - Scratch
  - IBM VisualAge
  - VisualWorks
- SPIN
- SuperCollider
- VBScript (Microsoft Office 'macro scripting' language)
- Visual DataFlex
- Visual FoxPro
- Visual Prolog
- X++
- Xojo
- XOTcl

== Object-oriented prototype-based languages ==
Prototype-based languages are object-oriented languages where the distinction between classes and instances has been removed:

- 1C:Enterprise programming language
- Actor-Based Concurrent Language (ABCL, ABCL/1, ABCL/R, ABCL/R2, ABCL/c+)
- Agora
- Cecil
- ECMAScript
  - ActionScript
  - ECMAScript for XML
  - JavaScript (first named Mocha, then LiveScript)
  - JScript
- Etoys in Squeak
- Io
- Lua
- MOO
- NewtonScript
- Obliq
- R
- Rebol
- Red
- Self (first prototype-based language, derived from Smalltalk)
- TADS

== Off-side rule languages ==
Off-side rule languages denote blocks of code by their indentation.

- ISWIM, the abstract language that introduced the rule
- ABC, Python's parent
  - Python
    - Cobra
    - Boo
- Miranda, Haskell's parent
  - Orwell
  - Haskell
    - Curry
- Elixir (, do: blocks)
- F#
- Nemerle (off-side optional)
- Nim
- Occam
- SPIN
- Scala (off-side optional)

== Procedural languages ==
Procedural programming languages are based on the concept of the unit and scope (the data viewing range) of an executable code statement. A procedural program is composed of one or more units or modules, either user coded or provided in a code library; each module is composed of one or more procedures, also called a function, routine, subroutine, or method, depending on the language. Examples of procedural languages include:

- Ada (multi-purpose language)
- ALGOL 58
  - JOVIAL
  - NELIAC
- ALGOL 60 (very influential language design)
  - SMALL Machine ALGOL Like Language
- ALGOL 68
- Alma-0
- BASIC (these lack most modularity in (especially) versions before about 1990)
- BCPL
- BLISS
- C
- C++
- C# (similar to Java/C++)
- Ceylon
- CHILL
- ChucK (C/Java-like syntax, with new syntax elements for time and parallelism)
- COBOL
- Cobra
- ColdFusion
- CPL (Combined Programming Language)
- Curl
- D
- Distributed Application Specification Language (DASL) (combine declarative programming and imperative programming)
- ECMAScript
  - ActionScript
  - ECMAScript for XML
  - JavaScript (first named Mocha, then LiveScript)
  - JScript
  - Source
- Eiffel
- Forth
- Fortran (better modularity in later Standards)
  - F
- GAUSS
- Go
- Harbour
- HyperTalk
- Java
  - Groovy
  - Join Java
  - Tea
- JOVIAL
- Julia
- Language H
- Lasso
- Modula-2 (fundamentally based on modules)
- MATLAB
- Mesa
- MUMPS (first release was more modular than other languages of the time; the standard has become even more modular since then)
- Nemerle
- Nim
- Oberon, Oberon-2 (improved, smaller, faster, safer follow-ons for Modula-2)
  - Component Pascal
  - Seneca
- OCaml
- Occam
- Oriel
- Pascal (successor to ALGOL 60, predecessor of Modula-2)
  - Free Pascal (FPC)
  - Object Pascal, Delphi
- PCASTL
- Perl
- Pike
- PL/C
- PL/I (large general-purpose language, originally for IBM mainframes)
- Plus
- PowerShell
- PROSE
- Python
- R
- Raku
- Rapira
- RPG
- Rust
- S-Lang
- VBScript
- Visual Basic
- Visual FoxPro
- Wolfram Mathematica (Wolfram language)
- Microsoft Dynamics AX (X++)

== Reflective languages ==
Reflective programming languages let programs examine and possibly modify their high-level structure at runtime or compile-time. This is most common in high-level virtual machine programming languages like Smalltalk, and less common in lower-level programming languages like C. Languages and platforms supporting reflection:

- Befunge
- C++ (since C++26)
- Ceylon
- Charm
- ChucK
- CLI
  - C#
- Cobra
- Component Pascal BlackBox Component Builder
- Curl
- Cypher
- D
- Delphi Object Pascal
- ECMAScript
  - ActionScript
  - ECMAScript for XML
  - JavaScript
  - JScript
- Emacs Lisp
- Eiffel
- Harbour
- Julia
- JVM
  - Java
  - Groovy
  - Join Java
  - X10
- Lisp
  - Clojure
  - Common Lisp
  - Dylan
  - Logo
  - Scheme
- Lua
- Maude system
- Oberon-2 – ETH Oberon System
- Objective-C
- PCASTL
- Perl
- PHP
- Pico
- Poplog
  - POP-11
- PowerShell
- Prolog
- Python
- Raku
- Rebol
- Red
- Ruby
- Rust (experimental)
- Smalltalk (pure object-orientation, originally from Xerox PARC)
  - Little Smalltalk
  - Self
  - Squeak
  - IBM VisualAge
  - VisualWorks
- SNOBOL
- Tcl
- Wolfram Mathematica (Wolfram language)
- XOTcl
- X++
- Xojo

== Rule-based languages ==
Rule-based languages instantiate rules when activated by conditions in a set of data. Of all possible activations, some set is selected and the statements belonging to those rules execute. Rule-based languages include:

- awk
- CLIPS
- Claire
- Constraint Handling Rules
- Drools
- GOAL agent programming language
- Jess
- OPS5
- Prolog
- ToonTalk – robots are rules
- Wolfram Mathematica (Wolfram language)
- XSLT

== Scripting languages ==
- AngelScript
- AppleScript
- AutoHotKey
- AutoIt
- AWK
- bc
- BeanShell
- C (via Tiny C Compiler)
- Ch (Embeddable C/C++ interpreter)
- CLI
  - C# (compiled to bytecode, and running JIT inside VM)
- CLIST
- ColdFusion
- ECMAScript
  - ActionScript
  - ECMAScript for XML
  - JavaScript
  - JScript
  - Source
- Emacs Lisp
- CMS EXEC
- EXEC 2
- Game Maker Language (GML)
- GDScript
- Io
- JASS
- Julia (compiled on the fly to machine code, by default, interpreting also available)
- JVM
  - Groovy
  - Java (via JBang)
  - Join Java
- Lasso
- Lua
- MAXScript
- MEL
- Oriel
- Pascal Script
- Perl
- PHP
- Python
- R
- Raku
- Rebol
- Red
- Rexx
  - Object REXX (OREXX, OOREXX)
- Revolution
- Ruby
- RUNCOM (scripting language for running CTSS) programs)
- S-Lang
- sed
- Smalltalk
- Squirrel
- Tea
- Tcl
- TorqueScript
- VBScript
- Many shell command languages have powerful scripting abilities:
  - sh and compatibles
    - Ksh
    - Bash
  - DIGITAL Command Language (DCL) on VMS
  - PowerShell (.NET-based CLI)

== Stack-based languages ==
Stack-based languages are a type of data-structured language that are based on the stack data structure.

- Beatnik
- Befunge
- Factor
- Forth
- Joy (all functions work on parameter stacks instead of named parameters)
- Piet
- Poplog via its implementation language POP-11
- PostScript
- RPL
- S-Lang

== Synchronous languages ==
Synchronous programming languages are optimized for programming reactive systems, systems that are often interrupted and must respond quickly. Many such systems are also called realtime systems, and are used often in embedded systems.

Examples:

- Argus
- Averest
- Esterel
- Lustre
- Signal
- Céu (programming language)

== Shading languages ==
A shading language is a graphics programming language adapted to programming shader effects. Such language forms usually consist of special data types, like "color" and "normal". Due to the variety of target markets for 3D computer graphics.

=== Real-time rendering ===
They provide both higher hardware abstraction and a more flexible programming model than previous paradigms which hardcoded transformation and shading equations. This gives the programmer greater control over the rendering process and delivers richer content at lower overhead.

- Adobe Graphics Assembly Language (AGAL)
- ARB assembly language (ARB assembly)
- OpenGL Shading Language (GLSL or glslang)
- High-Level Shading Language (HLSL) or DirectX Shader Assembly Language
- PlayStation Shader Language (PSSL)
- Metal Shading Language (MSL)
- Cg

=== Offline rendering ===
Shading languages used in offline rendering produce maximum image quality. Processing such shaders is time-consuming. The computational power required can be expensive because of their ability to produce photorealistic results.

- RenderMan Shading Language (RSL)
- Gelato Shading Language
- Open Shading Language (OSL)

== Syntax-handling languages ==
These languages assist with generating lexical analyzers and parsers for context-free grammars.

- ANTLR
- Coco/R (EBNF with semantics)
- GNU bison (FSF's version of Yacc)
- GNU Flex (FSF version of Lex)
- JavaCC
- lex (Lexical Analysis, from Bell Labs)
- M4
- Parsing expression grammar (PEG)
- Prolog
- Emacs Lisp
- Lisp
- Raku
- SableCC
- Scheme
- yacc (yet another compiler-compiler, from Bell Labs)
- XPL

== System languages ==
A system programming language is for low-level tasks like memory management or task management; it usually refers to a language used for systems programming; such languages are designed for writing system software, which usually requires different development approaches relative to application software.

System software is computer software designed to operate and control computer hardware, and provide a platform to run application software. System software includes software categories such as operating systems, utility software, device drivers, compilers, and linkers. Examples of system languages include:

Language	Originator	First appeared	Influenced by	Used for
ESPOL	Burroughs Corporation	1961	ALGOL 60	MCP
PL/I	IBM, SHARE	1964	ALGOL 60, FORTRAN, some COBOL	Multics
PL360	Niklaus Wirth	1968	ALGOL 60	ALGOL W
C	Dennis Ritchie	1969	BCPL	Most operating system kernels, including Windows NT and most Unix-like systems
PL/S	IBM	196x	PL/I	OS/360
BLISS	Carnegie Mellon University	1970	ALGOL-PL/I	VMS (portions)
PL/8	IBM	197x	PL/I	AIX
PL/MP and PL/MI	IBM	197x	PL/I	CPF, OS/400
PL-6	Honeywell, Inc.	197x	PL/I	CP-6
SYMPL	CDC	197x	JOVIAL	NOS subsystems, most compilers, FSE editor
C++	Bjarne Stroustrup	1979	C, Simula	See C++ Applications
Ada	Jean Ichbiah, S. Tucker Taft	1983	ALGOL 68, Pascal, C++, Java, Eiffel	Embedded systems, OS kernels, compilers, games, simulations, CubeSat, air traffic control, and avionics
D	Digital Mars	2001	C++	Multiple domains
Nim	Andreas Rumpf	2008	Ada, Modula-3, Lisp, C++, Object Pascal, Python, Oberon	OS kernels, compilers, games
Rust	Mozilla Research	2010	C++, Haskell, Erlang, Ruby	Servo layout engine, RedoxOS
Swift	Apple Inc.	2014	C, Objective-C, Rust	macOS, iOS app development (Note: Swift uses automatic reference counting.)
Zig	Andrew Kelley	2016	C, C++, LLVM IR, Go, Rust, JavaScript	As a replacement for C
V (Vlang)	Alexander Medvednikov	2019	C, Go, Oberon-2, Rust, Swift, Kotlin	Vinix OS, OS kernels, compilers, games

== Transformation languages ==
Transformation languages serve the purpose of transforming (translating) source code specified in a certain formal language into a defined destination format code. It is most commonly used in intermediate components of more complex super-systems in order to adopt internal results for input into a succeeding processing routine.

- ATL
- AWK
- MOFM2T
- QVT
- Raku
- XSLT is the best known XML transformation language

== Visual languages ==
Visual programming languages let users specify programs in a two-(or more)-dimensional way, instead of as one-dimensional text strings, via graphic layouts of various types. Some dataflow programming languages are also visual languages.

- Analytica
- Blockly
- Clickteam Fusion
- DRAKON
- Fabrik
- Grasshopper
- Max
- NXT-G
- Pict
- Prograph
- Pure Data
- Quartz Composer
- Scratch (written in and based on Squeak, a version of Smalltalk)
- Snap!
- Simulink
- Spreadsheets
- Stateflow
- Subtext
- ToonTalk
- VEE
- VisSim
- Vvvv
- XOD

== Wirth languages ==
Computer scientist Niklaus Wirth designed and implemented several influential languages.

- ALGOL W
- Euler
- Modula
  - Modula-2, Modula-3, variants
    - Obliq Modula 3 variant
- Oberon (Oberon, Oberon-07, Oberon-2)
  - Component Pascal
  - Oberon-2
- Pascal
  - Object Pascal (umbrella name for Delphi, Free Pascal, Oxygene, others)
- PL360

== XML-based languages ==
These are languages based on or that operate on XML.

- Ant
- Cω
- ECMAScript for XML
- Extensible Application Markup Language (XAML)
- LZX
- XPath
- XQuery
- XProc
- eXtensible Stylesheet Language Transformations (XSLT)

== See also ==
- Programming paradigm
- IEC 61131-3 – a standard for programmable logic controller (PLC) languages
- List of educational programming languages
- List of document markup languages
- List of markup languages
- List of open-source programming languages
- Esoteric programming language

== Notes ==
Programming books on Wikibooks
- Ada
- AppleScript
- AWK
- Bash
- BASIC
- Bourne shell
- C
- C Sharp
- C++
- Clojure
- Common Lisp
- CSS
- D
- Databases: Introduction
- Delphi
- Eiffel
- Elm
- Erlang
- F Sharp
- Forth
- Fortran
- Go
- GNU Octave
- Haskell
- HTML
- Io
- J2ME
- Java
- JavaScript
- Julia
- Lua
- MATLAB
- Node.js
- Objective-C
- OCaml
- Oz
- Pascal
- Perl
- PHP
- Prolog
- Python
- R
- Raku
- React and Node/Express web applications
- Rebol
- Ruby
- Ruby on Rails
- Scala
- Scheme
- Scheme
- SQL
- Swift
- Tcl
- Visual Basic
- Visual Basic .NET
- Visual Basic for Applications
- Windows batch scripting
- x86 assembly
