= Generational list of programming languages =

This is a "genealogy" of programming languages. Languages are categorized under the ancestor language with the strongest influence. Those ancestor languages are listed in alphabetic order. Any such categorization has a large arbitrary element, since programming languages often incorporate major ideas from multiple sources.

== ALGOL based ==
- ALGOL (also under Fortran)
  - Atlas Autocode
  - ALGOL 58 (IAL, International Algorithmic Language)
    - MAD and GOM (Michigan Algorithm Decoder and Good Old MAD)
  - ALGOL 60
    - MAD/I
    - Simula (see also Simula based)
    - SETL
      - ABC
        - Python
          - Julia (also under Lisp, Ruby, ALGOL)
          - Nim (also under Oberon)
          - Swift (also under Ruby, Objective-C, and Haskell)
          - Boo
          - Cobra (syntax and features)
  - ALGOL 68
  - ALGOL W
    - Pascal
      - Ada
        - SPARK
        - PL/SQL
      - Turbo Pascal
        - Object Pascal (Delphi)
          - Free Pascal (FPC)
          - Kylix (same as Delphi, but for Linux)
      - Euclid
        - Concurrent Euclid
        - Turing
          - Turing+ (Turing Plus)
          - Object-Oriented Turing
      - Mesa
        - Modula-2
          - Modula-3
          - Oberon (Oberon-1)
            - Go (also under C)
              - V (Vlang)
            - Nim (also under Python)
            - Oberon-2
              - Component Pascal
              - Active Oberon
                - Zonnon
            - Oberon-07
          - Lua (also under Scheme and SNOBOL)
      - SUE
        - Plus
  - CPL
    - BCPL
      - B
        - C (see also C based)

== APL based ==
- APL
  - A+
  - J (also under FL)
  - K (also under LISP)
  - NESL
  - PDL (also under Perl)

== BASIC based ==
- BASIC (also under Fortran II)
  - AmigaBASIC
  - Applesoft BASIC
  - AMOS BASIC
  - BASIC Stamp
  - Basic-256
  - BASIC09
  - BBC Basic
  - Blitz BASIC
    - Blitz3D
    - BlitzMax
    - BlitzPlus
  - Business Basic
  - Caché Basic
  - Chinese BASIC
  - Color BASIC
  - COMAL
  - Commodore BASIC
  - DarkBASIC
    - DarkBASIC Professional
  - Dartmouth BASIC
    - HP Time-Shared BASIC
      - Integer BASIC or Apple BASIC
    - Tiny BASIC
      - Atari BASIC
  - Euphoria
  - GLBasic
  - GRASS
  - Altair BASIC
    - Microsoft BASIC
      - GW-BASIC
        - QuickBASIC
          - QBasic
            - Basic4GL
            - FreeBASIC
            - Liberty BASIC
              - Run BASIC
          - Visual Basic
            - VBScript
            - Visual Basic for Applications (VBA)
              - LotusScript
            - Visual Basic .NET
              - Small Basic
            - B4X
            - Basic for Qt
            - OpenOffice Basic
            - HBasic
            - Gambas
            - WinWrap Basic
            - WordBasic
          - QB64
  - PureBasic
  - REALbasic (Xojo)
  - TI-BASIC
  - True BASIC
  - Turbo Basic
    - PowerBASIC
  - wxBasic
    - SdlBasic
      - RCBasic
  - XBasic
  - YaBasic

== Batch languages ==
- MS-DOS Batch files
  - Winbatch
- CLIST
- IBM Control Language (CL)
- IBM Job Control Language (JCL)

== C based ==
- C (also under BCPL)
  - Lua
  - Alef
  - C++
    - Rust (also under Cyclone, Haskell, and OCaml)
    - D
  - C#
    - Windows PowerShell (also under DCL, ksh, and Perl)
  - Cobra (class/object model and other features)
  - Java (see also Java based)
  - C--
  - Cyclone
    - Rust (also under C++, Haskell, and OCaml)
  - ColdFusion
  - Go (also under Oberon)
    - V (Vlang)
  - Harbour
    - Limbo
  - LPC
    - Pike
  - Objective-C (also under Smalltalk)
    - Swift (also under Ruby, Python, and Haskell)
  - PCASTL (also under Lisp)
  - Perl
    - Windows PowerShell (also under C#, DCL, and ksh)
    - S2
    - PHP
    - Ruby (also under Smalltalk)
      - Julia (also under Lisp, Python, ALGOL)
      - Swift (also under Objective-C, Python, and Haskell)
      - Crystal
      - Elixir (also under Erlang)
    - PDL (also under APL)
    - Raku
  - QuakeC
  - tcsh (also under sh)

== C# based ==
- C#
  - Chapel
  - Clojure
  - Crystal
  - D
  - J#
  - Dart
  - F#
  - Hack
  - Java
  - Kotlin
  - Nemerle
  - Oxygene
  - Rust
  - Swift
  - Vala
  - TypeScript

== COBOL based ==
- COBOL
  - ABAP
  - DIBOL
  - WATBOL

== COMIT based ==
- COMIT
  - SNOBOL
    - Icon
      - Unicon
    - Lua (also under Modula and Scheme)

== DCL based ==
- DCL
  - Windows PowerShell (also under C#, ksh, and Perl)

== ed based ==
- ed (programming language)
  - sed
  - AWK
    - Perl (also under C)

== Eiffel based ==
- Eiffel
  - Cobra (design by contract)
  - Sather
  - Ubercode

== Forth based ==
- Forth
  - InterPress
    - PostScript
  - Joy
    - Factor
  - Rebol (also under Lisp)
  - RPL (also under Lisp)

== Fortran based ==
- Fortran
  - Fortran II
    - BASIC (see also BASIC based)
    - SAKO
  - Fortran IV
    - WATFOR
    - WATFIV
  - Fortran 66
    - FORMAC
    - Ratfor
  - Fortran 77
    - WATFOR-77
    - Ratfiv
  - Fortran 90
  - Fortran 95
    - F
  - Fortran 2003
  - Fortran 2008
  - Fortran 2018
  - ALGOL (see also ALGOL based)

== FP based ==
- FP (Function Programming)
  - FL (Function Level)
    - J (also under APL)
  - FPr (also under Lisp and object-oriented programming)

== HyperTalk based ==
- HyperTalk
  - ActionScript (also under JavaScript)
  - AppleScript
  - LiveCode (Formerly Transcript)
  - SenseTalk
  - SuperTalk

== Java based ==
- Java (also under C)
  - Ateji PX
  - C#
  - Ceylon
  - Fantom
  - Groovy
  - OptimJ
  - Processing
  - Scala
  - Join Java
  - J#
  - Kotlin
  - X10

== JavaScript based ==
- JavaScript (also under Scheme, Self)
  - ActionScript (also under HyperTalk)
    - Haxe
  - Asm.js
  - CoffeeScript
  - ECMAScript
  - JavaScript OSA
  - JScript
  - TypeScript
    - AssemblyScript

== JOSS based ==
- JOSS
  - CAL
  - TELCOMP
  - FOCAL
  - MUMPS
    - Caché ObjectScript

JOSS also inspired features for several versions of BASIC, including Tymshare's SUPER BASIC and DEC's BASIC-PLUS.

== Lisp based ==
- Lisp
  - Arc
  - AutoLISP
  - Clojure
  - Common Lisp
    - uLisp (Common Lisp subset for microcontrollers)
    - ECMAScript (also based on Self)
      - JavaScript (also based on Self)
  - Emacs Lisp
  - ISLISP
  - Interlisp
  - Julia (has Lisp-like macros, but ALGOL-like syntax) (also under Python, Ruby, ALGOL)
  - K (also under APL)
  - LFE
  - Logo
    - Turtle graphics
  - MacLisp
  - Nu
  - PicoLisp
  - Rebol
    - Red (programming language)
  - RPL (also under Forth)
  - S
    - R
      - PCASTL (also under ALGOL)
  - Scheme
    - GNU Guile
    - Racket
    - Hop
    - Pico
    - T
    - Lua (also under Modula and SNOBOL)

== ML based ==
- ML
  - Standard ML (SML)
  - Caml
    - OCaml
      - F#
      - Reason
      - Rust (also under C++, Cyclone, and Haskell)

== PL/I based ==
- PL/I
  - PL/M
  - PL/C
  - Rexx
    - Object REXX (also under Smalltalk)
  - SP/k
  - XPL

== Prolog based ==
- Prolog
  - CLP(R), CLP(FD)
  - Mercury
  - Erlang
    - Cuneiform
    - Elixir (also under Ruby)
  - Logtalk

== SASL based ==
- SASL
  - Kent Recursive Calculator
  - Miranda
    - Haskell
      - Agda
      - Elm
      - Idris
      - Rust (also under C++, Cyclone, and OCaml)
      - Swift (also under Ruby, Python, and Objective-C)
      - PureScript
    - Nix

== SETL based ==
- SETL
  - ABC
    - Python (also under ALGOL)
      - Julia (also under Lisp, Ruby, ALGOL)
      - Nim (also under Oberon)
      - Swift (also under Ruby, Objective-C, and Haskell)
      - Boo
      - Cobra (syntax and features)

== sh based ==
- Sh
  - bash
  - csh (also under C)
    - tcsh
    - Hamilton C shell
  - fish
  - zsh
  - ksh
    - Windows PowerShell (also under C#, DCL, and Perl)
    - Qshell

== Simula based ==
- Simula (also under ALGOL 60)
  - C++ (also under C)
  - Smalltalk
    - Objective-C (hybrid of C and Smalltalk)
      - Swift (also under Ruby, Python, and Haskell)
      - Cobra (support both dynamic and static types)
    - Ruby (also under Perl)
      - Swift (also under Objective-C, Python, and Haskell)
      - Elixir (also under Erlang)
    - Self
      - JavaScript (also under Scheme) (see also JavaScript based)
      - NewtonScript
        - Io
    - Object REXX (also under Rexx)
  - BETA

== Tcl based ==
- Tcl
  - Expect
  - Tea

== Others ==
- Assembly
- BLISS
- CORAL
- Curl
- GPSS
- IDL
- LabVIEW
  - NXT-G
- Microsoft Power Fx
- occam
- POP-2, POP-11
- REFAL
- RPG (Report Program Generator)
- Seed7
- SQL (Structured Query Language)
- TACL (Tandem Advanced Command Language)
- TUTOR
- Joule
  - E
    - Pony
