= Beatnik (disambiguation) =

A beatnik is a stereotype the Beat Generation. Beatnik or Beatniks may also refer to:

== Arts, entertainment, and media ==
- Beatniks (novel), a 1997 novel by British author Toby Litt
- The Beatniks (film), a 1960 drama film

=== Music ===
- "Beatnik" (The Buggles song), a 1982 song by the Buggles
- "Beatnik" (The Clean song), a 1982 song by the Clean
- Los Beatniks, Argentine rock garage group
- The Beatniks (band), Japanese musical duo

== Technology ==
- Beatnik (company), a technology company founded by musician Thomas Dolby
- Beatnik satellite, a Sputnik-99 satellite launch aborted by Swatch in 1999
- Beatnik (programming language), an esoteric programming language
