= SMALL =

Computer programming language

Small Machine Algol Like Language
- Paradigms: Procedural, imperative, structured, object-oriented
- Family: ALGOL
- Designed by: Nevil Brownlee
- Developer: University of Auckland
- First appeared: 1980; 46 years ago
- Final release: Final / 1985; 41 years ago
- Implementation language: Fortran IV, SMALL
- Platform: Mainframes: Burroughs B6700, DEC PDP-10
- OS: TOPS-10, VM/CMS

Influenced by
- ALGOL

Small Machine Algol Like Language (SMALL), is a computer programming language developed by Nevil Brownlee of the University of Auckland.

== History ==
The aim of the language was to enable writing ALGOL-like code that ran on a small machine. It also included the string data type for easier text manipulation.

SMALL was used extensively from about 1980 to 1985 at Auckland University as a programming teaching aid, and for some internal projects. Originally, it was written in Fortran IV, to run on a Burroughs Corporation B6700 mainframe computer. Subsequently, it was rewritten in SMALL, and ported to a Digital Equipment Corporation (DEC) PDP-10 mainframe (on the operating system TOPS-10) and an IBM S360 mainframe (on the operating system VM Conversational Monitor System (VM/CMS)).

About 1985, SMALL had some object-oriented programming features added to handle structures (that were missing from the early language), and to formalise file manipulation operations.

== See also ==
- Lua (programming language)
- Squirrel (programming language)
