= Source (programming language) =

Family of JavaScript sub-languages

- Paradigms: Multi-paradigm: scripting, imperative, procedural, functional
- Family: ECMAScript: JavaScript
- First appeared: 2017; 8 years ago
- Stable release: 2024 (Strange) / 31 December 2021; 3 years ago
- Typing discipline: Dynamic, duck
- OS: browser-based
- License: Apache
- Filename extensions: .js
- Website: docs.sourceacademy.org

Major implementations
- Safari (Safari's JavaScript is properly tail recursive), Source Academy

Dialects
- Source §1, Source §2, Source §3, Source §4

Influenced by
- JavaScript, Scheme

Source is a family of sublanguages of JavaScript, developed for the textbook Structure and Interpretation of Computer Programs, JavaScript Edition (SICP JS). The JavaScript sublanguages Source §1, Source §2, Source §3, and Source §4 are designed to be only expressive enough to support all examples of the respective chapter of the textbook.

== Purpose and design principle ==
During the development of SICP JS, starting in 2008, it became clear that purpose-designed sublanguages of JavaScript would contribute to the learning experience. Initially called "JediScript" and inspired by the book "JavaScript: The Good Parts" by Douglas Crockford, the Source sublanguages follow the chapters of SICP JS; each language Source §x is a sublanguage of the next language Source §(x+1). Following the minimalist approach of SICP JS, implementations of Source are expected to remove any JavaScript language features that are not included in the language specification.

== Features ==
Source §1 is a very small purely functional sublanguage of JavaScript, designed for Chapter 1 of SICP JS. Source §2 adds pairs and a list library, following the data structures theme of Chapter 2. Source §3 adds stateful constructs, and Source §4 adds support for meta-circular evaluation. Chapter 5 of SICP JS does not require language support beyond Source §4. All Source languages are properly tail recursive, as required by Chapter 1 of SICP and as specified by ECMAScript 2015.

== Source Academy ==
Since the Safari browser is ECMAScript-2015-compliant, including proper tail calls, it can serve as an implementation of all Source languages, provided that the SICP package is loaded. The Source Academy is a web-based programming environment that implements all Source languages, regardless of browser support for proper tail calls, and features various tools for the readers of SICP JS. The language implementation in the Source Academy, js-slang, is also available as a standalone environment based on Node.js.
