= CHILL =

Programming language

- Paradigm: procedural
- Designed by: CCITT
- First appeared: 1980
- Stable release: 3.0? / 2003; 23 years ago
- Typing discipline: static, strong
- OS: telecommunication switches

Dialects
- Object CHILL

Influenced by
- COBOL, PL/1, Pascal, ALGOL 68

CHILL (an acronym for CCITT High Level Language) is a procedural programming language designed for use in telecommunication switches (the hardware used inside telephone exchanges). The language is still used for legacy systems in some telecommunication companies and for signal box programming.

The CHILL language is similar in size and complexity to the original Ada language. The first specification of the CHILL language was published in 1980, a few years before Ada.

ITU provides a standard CHILL compiler. A free CHILL compiler was bundled with GCC up to version 2.95: however, it was removed from later versions. An object-oriented version, called Object CHILL, was developed also.

ITU is responsible for the CHILL standard, known as ITU-T Rec. Z.200. The equivalent ISO standard is ISO/IEC 9496:2003. (The text of the two documents is the same). In late 1999 CCITT stopped maintaining the CHILL standard.

CHILL was employed in telecommunications systems such as the Alcatel System 12 and the Siemens EWSD.

== See also ==
- PLEX - Programming Language for Exchanges
- Erlang - language from Ericsson originally designed for telecommunication switches
