= 1C:Enterprise =

Technology product

1С:Enterprise platform
- Original author: 1C Company
- Type: Rapid application development, low-code development
- Website: www.1c.com www.1c-dn.com

1С:Enterprise is a low-code development platform developed by 1C Company for creating customizable business automation software.

== Overview ==
1C:Enterprise provides tools for developing business applications, including ERP, POS, and WMS software.

The platform utilizes a domain-driven design approach. Application development is conducted using an object-oriented language alongside visual editing interfaces, which are intended to minimize manual coding.

The platform architecture consists of:

- A data and process layer supporting various database management systems, an application server, and web server components.
- Predefined business components, such as configurable templates for catalogs, documents, ledgers, and business process logic.

== History ==
=== Versions for DOS ===
Several versions for the DOS operating system were developed in the 1990s: 3.0, 4.0, then simultaneously 5.0 and 2.0 PROF (which is almost identical to v5.0 in terms of functionality). 2.0 PROF was available in single-user and multi-user versions for local network collaboration. Versions 5.0 and 2.0 PROF implemented the concept of “working from the document” (where operations performed in an application generate legally significant documents), along with a built-in programming language, accounting records, and a printing form editor.

=== Version 6.0 ===
Version 6.0 for Windows 3.1 replaced version 5.0 in 1995. The new version shared features with the DOS versions but included a new core architecture.

=== Versions 7.х (7.0, 7.5, 7.7) ===
1С:Enterprise 7.0 and 1С:Enterprise 7.5 were superseded by 1С:Enterprise 7.7. V7.7 consists of a runtime engine that works with one or multiple databases defined in the application (referred to as a "configuration" in 1C:Enterprise terminology). Components that execute various accounting and administrative processes are plugged into the engine. Standard components include:

- Bookkeeping
- Operational accounting
- Payments
- Distributed InfoBase management
- Web extension

The built-in programming language used in v7.7 differs significantly from those used in versions 3.0-6.0. The “data objects” concept was introduced in v7.7. The language's capabilities were expanded, allowing developers to create non-business applications, including simple games such as Tetris and checkers.

=== Versions 8.x ===
The demo version of 1С:Enterprise 8.0 was launched on August 14, 2002. A year later, the first general commercial application – 1C:Enterprise 8.0 Trade Management – was released, which simultaneously marked the release of the 1C:Enterprise technology platform intended for mass-market use.[9] 1С:Enterprise 8 is localized into Russian, English, and Chinese, as well as a number of other languages (see Market Presence).

=== Version 8.2 ===
The key feature of v8.2 is the “managed application”: the user interface is described declaratively and adapts based on the type of client software:

- thick client (legacy client application from versions 8.0 and 8.1)
- thin client
- web client (includes both the client and the server; supports Internet Explorer, Mozilla Firefox, Chrome, Safari, and Microsoft Edge; the web server runs on Apache or IIS). Client-server interaction is performed using AJAX (DHTML), XMLHttpRequest, and JavaScript.

=== Version 8.9 ===
In May 2013, 1C Company announced the release of 1C:Enterprise 8.3, which introduced cloud functionality. 1C Company marketed this release as the most comprehensive version of the platform. The 1C:Enterprise cloud platform consists of the following services and technologies:

- HTTP (HTTPS) connection to applications for remote internet access.
- A web client that provides remote access to applications from various devices, including mobile, without requiring local software installation.
- A server cluster architecture designed for fault tolerance and scalability to support concurrent users.
- Multitenancy support through a data separation feature, enabling multiple customers to use a single application instance.
- SaaS infrastructure that allows vendors to provide web-based access to their applications under a usage-based payment model, rather than requiring customers to maintain local hardware and software.

=== Enterprise Development Tools ===
Alongside the v8.3 platform, 1C Company released an Eclipse-based development environment called Enterprise Development Tools (EDT). EDT introduces several features distinct from the traditional 1C:Enterprise development environment, including:

- Collaborative design and version control using Git
- Configuration analysis via ER-diagrams
- Information base and web server publication management directly from the development environment
- Real-time application validation during structural alterations and module editing
- Customization of development tools using Eclipse plug-ins

== Market presence ==
Various business applications intended for business process automation, reporting, and documentation have been developed using the 1C:Enterprise platform. According to a 2014 IDC study, 1C:Enterprise accounted for approximately one-third of the Russian enterprise software market, ranking second behind SAP's 49 percent.

The platform has been localized into more than 20 languages and is used in countries outside the Commonwealth of Independent States (CIS), including the US, Germany, Romania, Poland, Italy, Spain, and Vietnam.
