= Oriel (scripting language) =

- Paradigm: Imperative, Procedural
- Designed by: The LeBlond Group, Inc.
- First appeared: 1991
- OS: Microsoft Windows

Oriel is a scripting language released with the Power Tools series of instructional books written by the LeBlond Group. Described in its documentation as a "graphics-based batch language", it was originally designed for Microsoft Windows 3.0 and released with the book Windows 3 Power Tools in 1991. However, versions of the language were also bundled with Windows 3.1 Power Tools in 1992 and Windows NT Power Tools in 1994.

The suggested extension for an Oriel script file was ORL. Oriel was distributed with two executables: ORIEL.EXE, and MKRUNTIM.EXE. The former was the Oriel interpreter, which when invoked would prompt the user to choose a script file for execution. The latter gave the user the ability to create custom executables by bundling a script within a copy of the interpreter. In this way, an Oriel program could be distributed and run in the same way as any other Windows EXE.

The language was named after the oriel style of bay window. A window of that style is depicted in the icon distributed with the runtime.

== Examples ==
The following program displays a modal dialog box containing a hello, world message.

MessageBox(OK, 1, INFORMATION, "Hello, world!", "Oriel Says Hello", responseValue)

An Oriel program will always possess a main window over which a dialog box of this type would appear. The following code gives that window a title, maximizes it, and instructs it to remain open until the user closes it. This code also demonstrates retrieval of window information and use of string variables. A function call of SetWindow(MAXIMIZE) could replace the second and third lines.

{ Oriel comments are placed between curly brackets }
UseCaption("Welcome to Oriel")
WinGetActive(windowName$)
WinShow(windowName$, MAXIMIZE, resultValue)
MessageBox(OK, 1, INFORMATION, "Hello, world!", "Oriel Says Hello", responseValue)
WaitInput()

== See also ==
- Batch file
