= Tea (programming language) =

- Paradigm: Multi-paradigm: Functional, Object-oriented (class-based)
- Developer: Jorge Nunes
- First appeared: 1997
- Website: Tea

Influenced by
- Tcl, Java, Scheme

Tea is a high-level scripting language for the Java environment. It combines features of Scheme, Tcl, and Java.

== Features ==
- Integrated support for all major programming paradigms.
  - Functional programming language.
  - Functions are first-class objects.
  - Scheme-like closures are intrinsic to the language.
  - Support for object-oriented programming.
- Modular libraries with autoloading on-demand facilities.
- Large base of core functions and classes.
  - String and list processing.
  - Regular expressions.
  - File and network I/O.
  - Database access.
  - XML processing.
- 100% pure Java.
  - The Tea interpreter is implemented in Java.
  - Tea runs anywhere with a Java 1.6 JVM or higher.
  - Java reflection features allow the use of Java libraries directly from Tea code.
- Intended to be easily extended in Java. For example, Tea supports relational database access through JDBC, regular expressions through GNU Regexp, and an XML parser through a SAX parser (XML4J for example).

== Interpreter alternatives ==
Tea is a proprietary language. Its interpreter is subject to a non-free license. A project called "destea", which released as Language::Tea in CPAN, provides an alternative by generating Java code based on the Tea code.

TeaClipse is an open-source compiler that uses a JavaCC-generated parser to parse and then compile Tea source to the proprietary Tea bytecode.
