= PCASTL =

High-level programming language

- Paradigm: imperative, reflective
- Designed by: Philippe Choquette
- Developer: Philippe Choquette
- First appeared: 2008; 18 years ago
- Stable release: 3.5 / March 31, 2018; 7 years ago
- OS: Cross-platform
- License: GNU Lesser General Public License
- Website: www.pcosmos.ca/pcastl/

Influenced by
- C, R

The PCASTL (an acronym for by Parent and Childset Accessible Syntax Tree Language) is an interpreted high-level programming language. It was created in 2008 by Philippe Choquette. The PCASTL is designed to ease the writing of self-modifying code. The language has reserved words parent and childset to access the nodes of the syntax tree of the currently written code.

== Hello world ==
The "Hello world program" is quite simple:

"Hello, world!"

or

print("Hello, world!")

will do the same.

== Syntax ==
The syntax of PCASTL is derived from programming languages C and R. The source of R version 2.5.1 has been studied to write the grammar and the lexer used in the PCASTL interpreter.

=== Influences ===
Like in R, statements can, but do not have to, be separated by semicolons. Like in R, a variable can change type in a session. Like in C and R, PCASTL uses balanced brackets ({ and }) to make blocks.

Operators found in PCASTL have the same precedence and associativity as their counterparts in C. for loops are defined like in C. ++ and -- operators are used like in C to increment or decrement a variable before or after it is used in its expression.

An example of PCASTL using the for reserved word and the ++ operator:

for (i = 1; i < 4; i++) print(i)

Functions and comments in PCASTL are defined like in R:

# function definition (comment)
a = function()
{
   print("Hello, world!")
}

# function call
a()

=== parent and childset reserved words ===
Those reserved words can only be written lowercase and will not be recognized otherwise. The parent reserved word gives a reference to the parent node in the syntax tree of the code where the word is placed. In the following code, the parent node is the operator =.

a = parent

The variable "a" will hold a reference to the = node. The following code shows how to get references to the two child nodes of the operator = with the childset reserved word.

a.childset[0]
a.childset[1]

To display the value of "a", some ways are given in this example:

a
a.childset[0].parent
a.childset[1].parent
a.childset[0].parent.childset[0].parent # and so on...

In the following code: we assign a code segment to the right child of the = node, we execute the = node a second time and we call the newly defined function.

a.childset[1] = `function() print("hello")'
execute(a)
a()

== See also ==
- Abstract syntax tree
- Self-modifying code
