= Beatnik (programming language) =

Esoteric programming language

- Paradigm: Stack-oriented
- Designed by: Cliff L. Biffle
- Developer: Cliff L. Biffle
- First appeared: 2001; 25 years ago
- OS: Cross-platform
- Website: cliffle.com/esoterica/beatnik.html

Influenced
- l33t

Beatnik is a simple stack-oriented esoteric programming language, by Cliff L. Biffle. A Beatnik program consists of any sequence of English words. Each word is assigned the score one would get for it in a Scrabble game. The value of the score determines what function is performed. Functions include pushing the score of the next word onto the stack, testing the stack and skipping forward or backward in the program and other stack operations.

== Overview ==
=== Markup ===
The interpreter reads the words in the poem, ignoring punctuation and whitespace and newlines. Some functions are one word, other functions have an argument (they are two-word functions). Two-word functions are described below in the form "5,n". This means both the word whose value is 5 and the next word (whose value is 'n') are read.

Commands
Word value	Pseudo-code	Description
<5	NOOP	Optional: Interpreter may mock you
5,n	push(n)	Push the next word's value onto the stack.
6	pop()	Pop a number from the stack and discard it.
7	push(pop()+pop())	Pop two numbers, add them, and push the result.
8	push(input())	Input a character and push its value.
9	print(pop())	Pop a number and output it as a character.
10	push(pop()-pop())	Pop two numbers, subtract the first one popped from the second one popped, and push the result.
11	a = pop(); b = pop(); push(a); push(b)	Pop two numbers, swap them, and push them back.
12	a = pop(); push(a); push(a)	Pop a number and push it twice.
13,n	if(top()==0) jump(+n)	Pop a number and skip ahead n (actually n+1) words if the number is zero.
14,n	if(top()!=0) jump(+n)	Pop a number and skip ahead n (actually n+1) words if the number isn't zero.
15,n	if(top()==0) jump(-n)	Pop a number and skip back n words if the number is zero.
16,n	if(top()!=0) jump(-n)	Pop a number and skip back n words if the number isn't zero.
17	exit()	Stop the program.
18-23	NOOP	Optional: may mock you, but only if it has had a bad day.
>23	—N/a	Generates "Beatnik applause".

Legend
Pseudo-code	Meaning
NOOP	No operation
pop()	remove the value off the top of the stack, and return it
push(x)	place x on the stack
print(x)	print the character x
input()	read a character from the user. Blocks until character is read.
;	separates multiple statements. They are run in order.
if(expression) statement	if and only if the expression is true, execute the statement
jump(x)	move the reading location forward or backwards by x words.

Here are the Scrabble letter values, for reference.

== Examples ==
=== Hello World ===
A "Hello World" example in the Beatnik language.

Soars, larkspurs, rains.
Indistinctness.
Mario snarl (nurses, natures, rules...) sensuously retries goal.
Agribusinesses' costs par lain ropes (mopes) autos' cores.
Tuner ambitiousness.
Flit.
Dour entombment.
Legals' saner kinking lapse.
Nests glint.
Dread, tied futures, dourer usual tumor grunts alter atonal
  garb tries shouldered coins.
Taste a vast lustiness.
Stile stuns gad subgroup gram lanes.
Draftee insurer road: cuckold blunt, strut sunnier.
Rely enure pantheism: arty gain groups (genies, pan) titters, tattles, nears.
Bluffer tapes?  Idle diatom stooge!
Feted antes anklets ague?  Remit goiter gout!
Doubtless teared toed alohas will dull gangs' aerials' tails' sluices;
Gusset ends!  Gawkier halo!

Enter abstruse rested loser beer guy louts.
Curtain roams lasso weir lupus stunt.
Truant bears animate talon.  Entire torte originally timer.
Redo stilt gobs.

Utter centaurs;
Urgent stars;
Usurers (dilute);
Noses;
Bones;
Brig sonar graders;
Utensil silts;
Lazies.
Fret arson veterinary rows.

Atlas grunted: "Pates, slues, sulfuric manor liaising tines,
  trailers, rep... unfair!  Instant snots!"

Sled rested until eatery fail.
Ergs fortitude
  Indent spotter
Euros enter egg.
Curious tenures.
Torus cutlasses.
Sarong torso earns cruel lags it reeled.

Engineer: "Erase handbag -- unite ratification!"

oaring oaten donkeys unsold, surer rapid saltest tags
BUTTERED TIBIA LUGS REWIRING TOILETS
anion festers raring edit epilogues.
DIRGE ROTOR.
linnet oaring.
GORE BOOTIES.
Ironed goon lists tallest sublets --
Riots,
Raucous onset.

Ignobly, runners' diet anguishes sunrise loner.
Erode mob, slier switcher!
Loaners stilt drudge pearl atoll, risking hats' ends.

Rebind sitters.

Toga epistles -- crud lard.  (Pager purse dons souls.)

glob title a curio hired rites shed suds lade grease strut arctic revs toad
unless idlers rind stilt region land GERMICIDES SULTANA GUTS gill siting leans
nice spurs
tests gloves
roused asp

Holes!  Moles!  (Sores!)
Hygienists!  Scars!  (Asses!)
Smells spell rares.

Cubs instant sing in parse goodies.
Rosin.  Unhelpful sisal acres.  Slope told.
MALENESS PASTA LAB.  "Infirmary vine," rang illiterates (beans).
Rosin sours, insults truss abalones, nailed rules, helical atlases.
Dear remodeling stings mar rents.
Sunless shiner orb (silly idol.)
Clarity disses senna.
Vagabonds sauted; sloes performed gelds.
Alter post radial lip sectioning gums.
Saint Towellings.
Larger aeons telephone stolid char, pal!
Boats Dean forsook, rosters, tunas, terrariums -- united, traced.
Nude pagoda careens.

== See also ==
- List of esoteric programming languages
