= Cobra (programming language) =

Discontinued programming language

- Paradigm: Multi-paradigm: object-oriented
- Designed by: Charles Esterbrook
- Developer: Cobra Language LLC
- First appeared: 2006; 19 years ago
- Final release: 0.9.6 / December 23, 2013; 11 years ago
- Typing discipline: strong, static, dynamic, inferred
- OS: Microsoft .NET, Mono
- License: MIT
- Filename extensions: .cobra
- Website: cobra-language.com

Influenced by
- Python, Eiffel, C#, Objective-C

Cobra is a discontinued general-purpose, object-oriented programming language. Cobra is designed by Charles Esterbrook, and runs on the Microsoft .NET and Mono platforms. It is strongly influenced by Python, C#, Eiffel, Objective-C, and other programming languages. It supports both static and dynamic typing. It has support for unit tests and contracts. It has lambda expressions, closures, list comprehensions, and generators.

Cobra is an open-source project; it was released under the MIT License on February 29, 2008.

== Features ==
Object-oriented
- Namespaces
- Classes, interfaces, structs, extensions, enumerations
- Methods, properties, indexers
- Mixins, extension methods
- Generics, attributes
Quality control
- Contracts, assertions
- Unit tests, docstrings
- Compile-time nil-tracking
Expressiveness
- Static and dynamic binding
- List, dictionary, and set literals
- in and implies operator
- for expressions
- Slicing
- Interpolated strings
- Compile-time type inference
- Lambdas and closures
General productivity
- Exception handling
- Postmortem exception report
- Garbage collection
Scripting conveniences
- Clean syntax
- Dynamic binding
- One-step run
- Shebang line (#!)
Miscellaneous
- Documentation tool (cobra -doc)
- Syntax highlighting tool (cobra -highlight)

== Examples ==
The following examples can be run from a file using cobra <filename>.

=== Hello World ===
class Hello
    def main
        print 'HELLO WORLD'

=== A simple class ===
class Person

    var _name as String
    var _age as int

    cue init(name as String, age as int)
        _name, _age = name, age

    def toString as String is override
        return 'My name is [_name] and I am [_age] years old.'
