= Ubercode =

High-level programming language

Ubercode is a high-level programming language designed by Ubercode Software and released in 2005 for Microsoft Windows. Ubercode is influenced by Eiffel and BASIC. It is proprietary software and can be tried out for free for 30 days. Ubercode has the following design goals:

1. Compilable language—compiled into Windows EXE files.
2. Automatic memory management—memory is allocated / freed automatically, and the language has no memory management primitives.
3. Pre and post conditions—these are run-time assertions which are attached to function declarations, as in Eiffel.
4. High-level data types—resizable arrays, lists and tables may contain arbitrary components.
5. Integrated file handling—primitives for transparent handling of text, binary, CSV, XML and dBase files.
6. Ease of use—language structure is relatively simple, making the language accessible to beginners.

== Hello, World! ==
Here is the basic "Hello, World!" program:

Ubercode 1 class Hello

public function main()
code
  call Msgbox("Hello", "Hello World!")
end function

end class

== Preconditions and postconditions ==
Here is an example using pre- and postconditions. In the example, the IntToStr function validates its input as a string before converting it to an integer:

Ubercode 1 class PrePost

function IntToStr(in mystr:string[*] out value:integer)
precond IsDigitStr(mystr)
code
  call Val(mystr, value)
end function

public function main()
code
  call Msgbox("OOP example", "IntToStr(10) = " + IntToStr("10"))
end function

end class
