= F (programming language) =

Programming language: compiled, structured, array language

F language
- Paradigm: Array, procedural, modular
- Developer: The Fortran Company
- Typing discipline: static, manifest

Influenced by
- Fortran 95

F is a modular, compiled, numeric programming language, designed for scientific programming and scientific computation. F was developed as a modern Fortran, thus making it a subset of Fortran 95. It combines both numerical and data abstraction features from these languages. F is also backward compatible with Fortran 77, allowing calls to Fortran 77 programs. F was implemented on top of compilers from NAG, Fujitsu, Salford Software and Absoft. It was later included in the g95 compiler.

== Overview ==
F is designed to be a minimal subset of Fortran, with only about one hundred intrinsic procedures. Language keywords and intrinsic function names are reserved keywords in F and no other names may take this exact form. F contains the same character set used in Fortran 90/95 with a limit of 132 characters. Reserved words are always written in lowercase. Any uppercase letter may appear in a character constant. Variable names do not have restriction and can include upper and lowercase characters.

=== Operators ===
F supports many of the standard operators used in Fortran. The operators supported by F are:

- Arithmetic operators: +, -, *, /, **
- Relational operators: <, <=, ==, /=, >, >=
- Logical operators: .not., .and., .or., .eqv., .neqv.
- character concatenation: //

The assignment operator is denoted by the equal sign =. In addition, pointer assignment is denoted by =>. Comments are denoted by the ! symbol:

variable = expression ! assignment 
pointer => target ! pointer assignment

=== Data types ===
Similar to Fortran, the type specification is made up of a type, a list of attributes for the declared variables, and the variable list. F provides the same types as Fortran, except that double precision floating point variables must be declared as real with a kind with a kind parameter:

! type [,attribute list] :: entity declaration list
real :: x, y ! declaring variables of type real x,y without an attribute list
integer (kind = long), dimension (100) :: x ! declaring variable of type big integer array with the identifier x
character (len = 100) :: student_name ! declaring a character type variable with length 100

F does not have intrinsic support for object-oriented programming, but it does allow for records:

type, public :: City
     character (len = 100) :: name
     character (len = 50) :: state
end type City

Variable declarations are followed by an attribute list. The attributes allowed are parameter, public, private, allocatable, dimension, intent, optional, pointer, save and target. The attribute list is followed by ::, which is part of the syntax. F also allows for optional initialization in the list of objects. All items in a list will have the same attributes in a given type declaration statement. In addition, declarations are attribute oriented instead of entity oriented.

=== Statement and control flow ===
F supports 3 statements for control flow: if, a basic conditional, case, a switch statement, and do, a conditional while loop. The return, stop, cycle, and exit statements from Fortran may be used to break control flow.

real :: x

do i = 100
   x = x+i
   print*,i
   cycle
end do

max : do
   if (x > y) then
      exit max
   end if
   x = y
end do max
stop

if (x < y) then
     x = x + y
else if ( x > y) then
     x = y - x
end if

select case (maximum):
     case (0)
         x = 0
     case (1)
         x = 1
     case (5)
         x = 5
     case default 
         x = 10
end select

F places a heavy emphasis on modular programming.

program main
    ! Insert code here
end program main

Placing procedures outside of a module is prohibited. F supports most of the functions and subroutines found in the Fortran 95 standard library. All functions in F are external by default and require a result clause that returns the value of a function. F supports recursion.

All of the intrinsic procedures found in Fortran 95 may be used in F, with the exceptions of achar, iachar, lge, lgt, lle, llt, transfer, dble, dim, dprod, and mod.

== Bibliography ==
- Walter S. Brainerd, Charles H. Goldberg, and Jeanne C. Adams: "Programmer's Guide to F", Unicomp, 1996.
- Gehrke, Wihelm (1997-05-30). The F Language Guide. Springer. ISBN 978-3-540-76165-5.
- Robin A. Vowels: "Algorithms and Data Structures in F and Fortran", Unicomp.
- Loren Meissner: "Essential Fortran 90 & 95", Unicomp, 1997.
