= Vysotsky (surname) =

Vysotsky, Vysotskiy, Wissotzky or Vyssotsky (Russian: Высоцкий) is a Slavic masculine surname, its feminine counterpart is Vysotskaya, Wissotzkaya or Vysotskaia. It may refer to

- Aleksey Vysotsky (1919–1977), Russian journalist
- Alexander Vysotsky (born 1968), former professional ice hockey player from Kazakhstan
- Alexander Vyssotsky (1888–1973), Russian-American astronomer
- Emma Vyssotsky (1894–1975), American astronomer
- Georgy Vysotsky (1865–1940), Ukrainian forester and ecologist
- Ida Wissotzkaya, an intimate friend of the Russian writer Boris Pasternak
- Igor Vysotsky (1953–2023), Soviet amateur boxer
- Ivan Vysotskiy (born 1962), Ukrainian rower
- Julia Vysotskaya (born 1973), Russian actress and television presenter
- Kalonimus Wolf Wissotzky (1824–1904), Russian tea merchant, relative of Ida
- Maksim Vysotskiy (born 1995), Belarusian football player
- Nadzeya Vysotskaya (born 1988), Belarusian artistic gymnast
- Victor A. Vyssotsky (1931–2012), American mathematician and computer scientist, son of Alexander Vyssotsky
- Vladimir Vysotsky (1938–1980), Russian singer/songwriter, actor, and poet
- Vladimir Vysotsky (admiral) (1954–2021), Russian admiral

== See also ==
- Wysocki
