= Lorinda Cherry =

Computer scientist and original Unix team member (1944–2022)

- Cherry in 2019
- Born: Lorinda Landgraf; November 18, 1944
- Died: February 11, 2022 (aged 77)
- Occupations: Computer scientist, programmer

Lorinda Cherry (née Landgraf; November 18, 1944 – February 11, 2022) was an American computer scientist and programmer. Much of her career was spent at Bell Labs, where she was for many years a member of the original Unix Lab. Cherry developed several mathematical tools and utilities for text formatting and analysis, and influenced the creation of others.

== Early life ==
Cherry was born on November 18, 1944, to John F. and Evelyn K. Landgraf. She had one sister, Carynn Elizabeth. Raised in Verona, New Jersey, she graduated from Verona High School and received a Bachelor of Arts (Mathematics) from the University of Delaware in 1966.

== Computer science career ==
Cherry started as a Technical Assistant (TA) at Bell Labs in 1966, initially working in Acoustics and Speech Research on vocal tract simulation. She received her Masters in computer science from Stevens Institute of Technology in 1969.

At Bell Labs, Cherry was involved in projects with Ken Knowlton and James L. Flanagan related to computer graphics that resulted in the computer animation language BEFLIX, and the Atoms program for creating images of three-dimensional stick-and-ball molecular models. She also worked with Manfred Schroeder to produce computer graphics for a show at the Brooklyn Museum. Her time spent writing FORTRAN programs for others' projects convinced Cherry that her own interests lay in pursuing systems work.

For a period of about one year, Cherry was attached to the anti-ballistic missile Safeguard Program, working on the utility recording system. This change necessitated her relocating to Bell's Whippany, New Jersey, facility, as well as spending time at the test site located on the Kwajalein Atoll, where her husband had earlier been posted. Cherry monitored the results of missile test firings. Prior to her departure to Whippany, she confirmed with Samuel Pope Morgan Jr., then director of computing science research at Bell, that she would be able to return to her previous position.

In 1971 Cherry joined the Computing Science Research Center, where her work focused on graphics, word processing, and language design. Some of her earliest work there consisted of configuring systems to run an early version of Unix written in assembly language. She was introduced to the system by Douglas McIlroy.

Cherry participated in several projects that involved the statistical analysis of text. In one project, she and Robert Morris developed a technique to identify typographical errors using digrams and trigrams, a table of common English words, and the root-mean-square of the trigram indices. This led to the development of typo, a program that became the de facto spell checker for Unix until spell replaced it.

Cherry was promoted to a Member of the Technical Staff (MTS) in 1976, giving her more freedom to pursue her own projects. One of the first projects that she personally initiated after becoming a member of the technical staff also involved use of trigrams to compress the text contained in a telephone directory.

After McIlroy had written the speak program for the Votrax speech synthesizer, work to add intonation was taken on by another researcher, possibly Brenda Baker. Cherry's contribution to the effort was to develop a tool to identify parts-of-speech.

Cherry also worked on mathematical tools. She and Morris rewrote dc, the arbitrary precision, postfix notation desk calculator program. She then created bc, a preprocessor for dc using infix notation. Cherry initiated work on the equation editor eqn, which was completed with Brian Kernighan. Kernighan described eqn as having an "auditory syntax" that allowed equations to be written programmatically the same way they were spoken.

Her work on libplot inspired the later GNU plotutils package.

Cherry built tools for creating and editing text. She made revisions to the ed editor. She also created the form letter generator, form, and its associated editor, fed. More than a simple text generator, form is described as a "personal database", and likened to Vannevar Bush's Memex concept.

Cherry made several contributions to the development of electronic typesetting, many related to troff. She cowrote the 1979 edition of "Typing Documents on the UNIX System: Using the –ms and –mcs Macros with Troff" with Mike Lesk for the Unix Tenth Edition Manual. Cherry and Lesk created tbl, a tool for formatting tables. She personally authored deroff, which strips all troff commands from the input. Cherry programmed a video display so that typeset documents could be previewed on a screen rather than having to create a photographic print. She also made contributions to TeX.

Cherry, Morris, and Lee E. McMahon performed an analysis of nine documents: three of The Federalist Papers from different authors, an article from the Bell System Technical Journal, an article written by Mark Twain, a technical paper, and three samples of graded text on different topics. One of the goals of this work was to see if the authorship of The Federalist Papers could be determined by such an analysis. Another part of the same research used trigram compression and the Brown Corpus created by Kučera and Francis to analyze specific vocabulary for use in Bell System Practice.

Cherry developed a method to identify the topic being discussed in a selected passage of text, which she used to create the first index for the Unix Manual. This technique was applied to other written works. Cherry also created a pocket command reference called the "Purple Card" to accompany the sixth and seventh editions of the Unix Programmers Manual.

Cherry was involved in development of Bell Labs's Writer's Workbench (wwb) writing toolsuite, to the extent that she considered herself the project's "grandmother". The project was conceived of by Rutgers professor William Vesterman, who wanted a tool that could analyze writing style. Cherry updated parts for Vesterman's project, and wrote two new programs — style and diction — for it, which was expected to be the extent of her involvement. Development of what became Writer's Workbench was led by Bell psycholinguist Nina Macdonald of the Human Performance Engineering Department. Macdonald contacted Cherry to ask permission to use parts for Writer's Workbench. In addition to Alfred Aho's pattern search work, Writers Workbench would use at least three technologies that Cherry had already worked on: electronic typesetting, parts-of-speech analysis, and statistical analysis of speech. While Macdonald worked on the front end and integrating the program's utilities, Cherry continued to write code for the back end of the project. Cherry and Macdonald collaborated on an article for Bell Laboratories Record magazine in May/June 1983, an article in Byte magazine in October 1983, and a presentation delivered to a joint meeting of the psychology and computer science divisions of the New York Academy of Sciences in 1981. Both also presented the software to a television audience on two occasions; on NBC's Today show in May 1981, and on New York's WCBS Channel 2 News in August 1983. After letting Andrew Tanenbaum use the program on an early draft of a book he was writing, Cherry commented on the ability of tools like Writer's Workbench to improve the quality of written text not only by correcting errors, but by changing how writers write. She stated:

My feeling about a lot of those tools is their value in education is as much pointing out to people who are learning to write that they have choices and make choices when they do it. They don't think of a writing task as making choices per se. Once they get it on paper they think it's cast in stone. So it makes them edit.

After the wwb was released in 1980, Bell Labs incorporated it into company-wide writing workshops.

One of the last projects Cherry did was an analysis of transcriptions of calls to AT&T Trouble Centers, searching these inconsistently formatted texts for evidence of systemic problems. The work resulted in changes in AT&T's internal policies. She was one of three co-inventors listed on AT&T's patent on a "Method and system for verifying the status of 911 emergency telephone services". In July 1994 Cherry was part of a group that worked to make AT&T's 1-800 numbers directory available on the nascent Internet. The team dealt with both technical and political issues to produce the online directory, which became one of the first "Cool links" identified by Yahoo!.

Although most of her work was done for the Unix environment, Cherry's work was also included in the Plan 9 operating system.

At the divestiture of AT&T and Lucent in 1996, Cherry went with the newly formed AT&T Labs.

== Personal life and death ==
Cherry, who lived in the Gillette, New Jersey, section of Long Hill Township, New Jersey, joined the Northern New Jersey Region chapter of the Sports Car Club of America (SCCA) in July 1967. She raced cars, served as marshal, and handled administrative duties. She also showed award-winning Doberman Pinschers.

Cherry died in February 2022, at the age of 77. Her death was announced on February 16, 2022. She was survived by her sister, Carynn Kelley-Katz.

== Honors ==
- 1988 William G. Giltzow Award—For exemplifying "dedication and service to the NNJR-SCCA".
- 2018 Pioneer in Tech Award—Awarded by the National Center for Women & Information Technology.
