= Vysotsky (disambiguation) =

Vladimir Vysotsky (1938–1980) was a Russian singer-songwriter, poet and actor who had an immense and enduring effect on Soviet culture.

Vysotsky (masculine), Vysotskaya (feminine), or Vysotskoye (neuter) and variants such as Vysotskiy, Wissotzky or Vyssotsky may refer to:

Places

- Vysotsky (inhabited locality) (Vysotskaya, Vysotskoye), several rural localities in Russia
- Vysotsk municipal formation in Vyborgsky District of Leningrad Oblast, Russia
- Vysotsky Island, Russian-Finnish territory in Baltic Sea a/k/a Maly Vysotsky Island
- Vysotsky Monastery, Russian Orthodox iconic venue in Serpukhov
- Vysotskiy Peak in Antarctica

Other

- Vysotsky (surname), including variants
- Vysotsky (skyscraper) in Yekaterinburg, Russia, named after Vladimir Vysotsky
- 2374 Vladvysotskij, main belt asteroid named after Vladimir Vysotsky
- 1600 Vyssotsky, main belt asteroid

== See also ==
- Wysocki (surname)
