= AD Leonis =

M type star in the constellation Leo

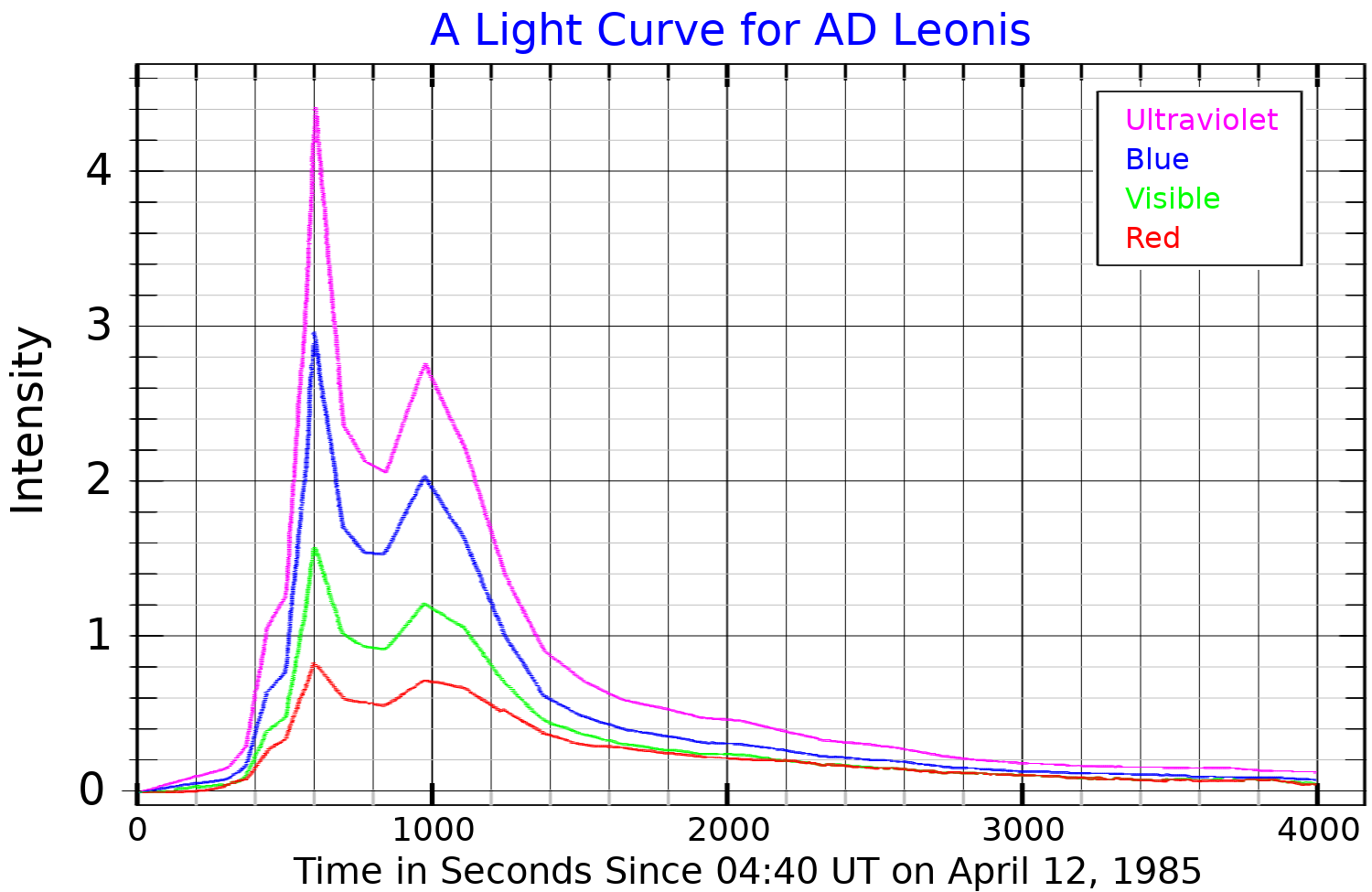
- U, B, V and R light curves for a flare on AD Leonis, adapted from Hawley and Pettersen (1991)

Observation data Epoch J2000 Equinox ICRS
- Constellation: Leo
- Right ascension: 10^{h} 19^{m} 36.28082^{s}
- Declination: +19° 52′ 12.0104″
- Apparent magnitude (V): 9.32

Characteristics
- Spectral type: M3.5eV
- U−B color index: +1.06
- B−V color index: +1.54
- Variable type: Flare star

Astrometry
Radial velocity (R_{v})	+10.67±0.21 km/s
Proper motion (μ)	RA: –498.620 mas/yr Dec.: –43.428 mas/yr
Parallax (π)	201.4064±0.0296 mas
Distance	16.194 ± 0.002 ly (4.9651 ± 0.0007 pc)
Absolute magnitude (M_{V})	10.87

Details
Mass	0.423±0.012 M_{☉}
Radius	0.4233±0.0057 R_{☉}
Luminosity	0.02359±0.00011 L_{☉}
Surface gravity (log g)	5.12±0.12 cgs
Temperature	3,477±23 K
Metallicity [Fe/H]	−0.19±0.12 dex
Rotation	2.2270+0.0010 −0.0011 d
Rotational velocity (v sin i)	2.4±1.5 km/s
Age	25-300 Myr

Other designations
- Gliese 388, BD+20 2465, G 54-23, LHS 5167, LTT 12761, NLTT 24015, SAO 81292, PLX 2420, TYC 1423-174-1

Database references
SIMBAD	data
- Location of AD Leonis in the constellation Leo

AD Leonis (Gliese 388) is a red dwarf star. It is located relatively near the Sun, at a distance of 16.2 light-years (5.0 parsecs), in the constellation Leo. AD Leonis is a main sequence star with a spectral classification of M3.5V. It is a flare star that undergoes random increases in luminosity.

== Properties ==
AD Leonis is an M-type star with a spectral type M3.5eV, indicating it is a main sequence star that displays emission lines in its spectrum. At a trigonometric distance of 16.2 ly (5.0 pc), it has an apparent visual magnitude of 9.43. It has about 39–42% of the Sun's mass — above the mass at which a star is fully convective — and 39% of the Sun's radius. The projected rotation of this star is only 2.4 km/s, but it completes a rotation once every 2.227 days, indicating a relatively pole-on inclination of about 12.9°. It is a relatively young star with an estimated age of 25–300 million years, and is considered a member of the young disk population.

The variability of this star was first observed in 1949 by Katherine C. Gordon and Gerald E. Kron at Lick Observatory. AD Leonis is one of the most active flare stars known, and the emissions from the flares have been detected across the electromagnetic spectrum as high as the X-ray band. The net magnetic flux at the surface is about 3 kG. Besides star spots, about 73% of the surface is covered by magnetically active regions. Examination of the corona in X-ray shows compact loop structures that span up to 30% of the size of the star. The average temperature of the corona is around 6.39 MK.

This star is orbiting through the Milky Way galaxy with an eccentricity of 0.028 . This carries the star as close as 8.442 kpc from the galactic core, and as far as 8.926 kpc. The orbital inclination carries it as far as 0.121 kpc from the plane of the galaxy.

In 2021, a superflare on AD Leo was observed simultaneously in X-ray by XMM-Newton and in optical by TESS.

== Search for planets ==
During a 1943 proper motion study by Dirk Reuyl at McCormick Observatory, AD Leonis was suspected of having a companion. However, a 1968 study by Sarah L. Lippincott at Sproul Observatory was unable to confirm this result. A 1997 search with a near-infrared speckle interferometer failed to detect a companion orbiting 1–10 AU from the star. In 2001, an optical coronagraph was used to example the star, but no companion was found. As of 1981, there was no sign of variability in its radial velocity, which would otherwise indicate the presence of an unseen companion.

In 2018, AD Leonis was found to have radial velocity variations with a period of 2.23 days. The star was found to rotate with the same period, suggesting that the stellar rotation may be the cause of the radial velocity signal, but it was thought possible that the signal was caused by a planet of 0.24 M_{J} in a spin-orbit resonance with the star. This was listed as a candidate planet in a 2019 preprint. However, subsequent studies starting in 2020 refuted the planet hypothesis, finding stellar activity to be the most likely explanation for the radial velocity variations. A 2022 study confidently ruled out planets more massive than 27 M_{🜨} orbiting at the stellar rotation period, as well as planets more than 3-6 M_{J} with periods up to 14 years.

== See also ==
- List of nearest stars and brown dwarfs
- Gamma Leonis, located just 5' from AD Leonis
- EV Lacertae
