= RoboWar =

1990 open-source video game

- RoboWar icon
- Original author: David Harris
- Release: 1990
- Stable release: 5.39
- Operating system: Windows, Mac OS
- Type: Programming game
- License: GNU General Public License
- Website: https://robowar.sourceforge.net/

RoboWar is an open-source video game in which the player programs onscreen icon-like robots to battle each other with animation and sound effects. The syntax of the language in which the robots are programmed is a relatively simple stack-based one, based largely on IF, THEN, and simply-defined variables.

25 RoboWar tournaments were held in the past between 1990 until roughly 2003, when tournaments became intermittent and many of the major coders moved on. All robots from all tournaments are available on the RoboWar website.

The RoboWar programming language, RoboTalk, is a stack-oriented programming language and is similar in structure to FORTH.

== Programming features ==
RoboWar for the Macintosh was notable among the genre of autonomous robot programming games for the powerful programming model it exposed to the gamer. By the early 1990s, RoboWar included an integrated debugger that permitted stepping through code and setting breakpoints. Later editions of the RoboTalk language used by the robots (a cognate of the HyperTalk language for Apple's HyperCard) included support for interrupts as well.

== History ==
RoboWar was originally released as a closed source shareware game in 1990 by David Harris for the Apple Macintosh platform. The source code has since been released and implementations are now also available for Microsoft Windows. It was based upon the same concepts as the 1981 Apple II game RobotWar.

Initially tournaments were run by David Harris himself. Between 1997 and 2001, Lucas Dixon helped run tournaments and maintained the code, and eventually they were run by Eric Foley.

== See also ==
- Core War
- RobotWar
- Crobots
- Robot Battle
