= Bc (programming language) =

Arbitrary-precision calculator supporting interactive and scripted use

bc
- Developers: Robert Morris and Lorinda Cherry of Bell Labs
- Initial release: 1975, 50–51 years ago
- Operating system: Unix, Unix-like, Plan 9, FreeDOS
- Platform: Cross-platform
- Type: Command
- Website: www.gnu.org/software/bc/

bc is an arbitrary-precision mathematical calculator program with an input language similar to C. It supports both interactive, command-line user-interface and script processing.

== Overview ==
A typical interactive usage is typing the command bc on a Unix command prompt and entering a mathematical expression, such as (1 + 3) * 2, whereupon 8 will be output.

While bc can work with arbitrary precision, it defaults to zero digits after the decimal point, so the expression 2/3 yields 0 (results are truncated, not rounded). This can surprise new bc users. The -l option to bc sets the default scale (digits after the decimal point) to 20 and adds several additional mathematical functions to the language.

== History ==
bc first appeared in Version 6 Unix in 1975. It was written by Lorinda Cherry of Bell Labs as a front end to dc, an arbitrary-precision calculator written by Robert Morris and Cherry. dc performed arbitrary-precision computations specified in reverse Polish notation. bc provided a conventional programming-language interface to the same capability via a simple compiler (a single yacc source file comprising a few hundred lines of code), which converted a C-like syntax into dc notation and piped the results through dc.

In 1991, POSIX rigorously defined and standardized bc. Four implementations of this standard survive today: The first is the traditional Unix implementation, a front-end to dc, which survives in Unix and Plan 9 systems. The second is the free software GNU bc, first released in 1991 by Philip A. Nelson. The GNU implementation has numerous extensions beyond the POSIX standard and is no longer a front-end to dc (it is a bytecode interpreter). The third is a re-implementation by OpenBSD in 2003. The fourth is an independent implementation by Gavin Howard that is included in Android (operating system), FreeBSD as of 13.3-RELEASE, and macOS as of 13.0.

== Etymology ==
The original UNIX version 6 manual does not explain what “bc” stands for. Various sources over the years referred to it as “basic calculator”, “bench calculator” and “binary calculator”.

== Implementations ==
=== POSIX bc ===
The POSIX standardized bc language is traditionally written as a program in the dc programming language to provide a higher level of access to the features of the dc language without the complexities of dc's terse syntax.

In this form, the bc language contains single-letter variable, array and function names and most standard arithmetic operators, as well as the familiar control-flow constructs (if(cond)..., while(cond)... and for(init;cond;inc)...) from C. Unlike C, an if clause may not be followed by an else.

Functions are defined using a define keyword, and values are returned from them using a return followed by the return value in parentheses. The auto keyword (optional in C) is used to declare a variable as local to a function.

All numbers and variable contents are arbitrary-precision numbers whose precision (in decimal places) is determined by the global scale variable.

The numeric base of input (in interactive mode), output and program constants may be specified by setting the reserved ibase (input base) and obase (output base) variables.

Output is generated by deliberately not assigning the result of a calculation to a variable.

Comments may be added to bc code by use of the C /* and */ (start and end comment) symbols.

==== Mathematical operators ====
===== Exactly as C =====
The following POSIX bc operators behave exactly like their C counterparts:

+     -     *     /
+=    -=    *=    /=
++    --    <     >
==    !=    <=    >=
( )   [ ]   { }

===== Similar to C =====
The modulus operators, % and %= behave exactly like their C counterparts only when the global scale variable is set to 0, i.e. all calculations are integer-only. Otherwise the computation is done with the appropriate scale. a%b is defined as a-(a/b)*b. Examples:

$ bc
bc 1.06
Copyright 1991-1994, 1997, 1998, 2000 Free Software Foundation, Inc.
This is free software with ABSOLUTELY NO WARRANTY.
For details type `warranty'.
scale=0; 5%3
2
scale=1; 5%3
.2
scale=20; 5%3
.00000000000000000002

===== Conflicting with C =====
The operators

^     ^=

superficially resemble the C bitwise exclusive-or operators, but are in fact the bc integer exponentiation operators.

Of particular note, the use of the ^ operator with negative numbers does not follow the C operator precedence. -2^2 gives the answer of 4 under bc rather than −4.

===== "Missing" operators relative to C =====
The bitwise, Boolean and conditional operators:

&     |     ^     &&    ||
&=    |=    ^=    &&=   ||=
<<    >>
<<=   >>=
?:

are not available in POSIX bc.

==== Built-in functions ====
The sqrt() function for calculating square roots is POSIX bc's only built-in mathematical function. Other functions are available in an external standard library.

The scale() function for determining the precision (as with the scale variable) of its argument and the length() function for determining the number of significant decimal digits in its argument are also built-in.

==== Standard library functions ====
bc's standard math library (defined with the -l option) contains functions for calculating sine, cosine, arctangent, natural logarithm, the exponential function and the two parameter Bessel function J. Most standard mathematical functions (including the other inverse trigonometric functions) can be constructed using these. See external links for implementations of many other functions.

The bc standard library
bc command	Function	Description
s(x)	Sine	Takes x, an angle in radians
c(x)	Cosine	Takes x, an angle in radians
a(x)	Arctangent	Returns radians
l(x)	Natural logarithm	
e(x)	Exponential function	
j(n,x)	Bessel function	Returns the order-n Bessel function of x.

The -l option changes the scale to 20, so things such as modulo may work unexpectedly. For example, writing bc -l and then the command print 3%2 outputs 0. But writing scale=0 after bc -l and then the command print 3%2 will output 1.

=== Plan 9 bc ===
Plan 9 bc is identical to POSIX bc but for an additional print statement.

=== GNU bc ===
GNU bc derives from the POSIX standard and includes many extensions. It is entirely separate from dc-based implementations of the POSIX standard and is instead written in C. Nevertheless, it is fully backwards compatible as all POSIX bc programs will run unmodified as GNU bc programs.

GNU bc variables, arrays and function names may contain more than one character, some more operators have been included from C, and notably, an if clause may be followed by an else.

Output is achieved either by deliberately not assigning a result of a calculation to a variable (the POSIX way) or by using the added print statement.

Furthermore, a read statement allows the interactive input of a number into a running calculation.

In addition to C-style comments, a # character will cause everything after it until the next new-line to be ignored.

The value of the last calculation is always stored within the additional built-in last variable.

==== Extra operators ====
The following logical operators are additional to those in POSIX bc:

&&     ||      !

They are available for use in conditional statements (such as within an if statement). Note, however, that there are still no equivalent bitwise or assignment operations.

==== Functions ====
All functions available in GNU bc are inherited from POSIX. No further functions are provided as standard with the GNU distribution.

== Example code ==
Since the bc ^ operator only allows an integer power to its right, one of the first functions a bc user might write is a power function with a floating-point exponent. Both of the below assume the standard library has been included:

=== A "power" function in POSIX bc ===
 /* A function to return the integer part of x */
 define i(x) {
    auto s
    s = scale
    scale = 0
    x /= 1   /* round x down */
    scale = s
    return (x)
 }

 /* Use the fact that x^y == e^(y*log(x)) */
 define p(x,y) {
    if (y == i(y)) {
       return (x ^ y)
    }
    return ( e( y * l(x) ) )
 }

=== Calculating π to 10000 digits ===
Calculate pi using the builtin arctangent function, a():

$ bc -lq
scale=10000
4*a(1) # The atan of 1 is 45 degrees, which is pi/4 in radians.
       # This may take several minutes to calculate.

=== A translated C function ===
Because the syntax of bc is similar to that of C, published numerical functions written in C can often be translated into bc quite easily, which immediately provides the arbitrary precision of bc. For example, in the Journal of Statistical Software (July 2004, Volume 11, Issue 5), George Marsaglia published the following C code for the cumulative normal distribution:

double Phi(double x)
{
    long double s=x,t=0,b=x,q=x*x,i=1;
    while(s!=t)
        s=(t=s)+(b*=q/(i+=2));
    return .5+s*exp(-.5*q-.91893853320467274178L);
}

With some necessary changes to accommodate bc's different syntax, and noting that the constant "0.9189..." is actually ln(2*PI)/2, this can be translated to the following GNU bc code:

define phi(x) {
    auto s,t,b,q,i,const
    s=x; t=0; b=x; q=x*x; i=1
    while(s!=t)
        s=(t=s)+(b*=q/(i+=2))
    const=0.5*l(8*a(1))   # 0.91893...
    return .5+s*e(-.5*q-const)
}

== Using bc in shell scripts ==
bc can be used non-interactively, with input through a pipe. This is useful inside shell scripts. For example:

$ result=$(echo "scale=2; 5 * 7 /3;" | bc)
$ echo $result
11.66

In contrast, note that the bash shell only performs integer arithmetic, e.g.:

$ result=$((5 * 7 /3))
$ echo $result
11

One can also use the here-string idiom (in bash, ksh, csh):

$ bc -l <<< "5*7/3"
11.66666666666666666666

== See also ==
- dc programming language
- C programming language
- hoc programming language
