= Crobots =

- Original author(s): Tom Poindexter
- Initial release: December 1985
- Stable release: 1.1 patch level 2.1 / November 22, 2003
- Written in: C
- Operating system: MS-DOS, Windows, Linux ELF i686, Linux ELF x86_64, IBM AIX 5.3, HP-UX, PlayStation 3, Solaris 9, Mac OS X
- Platform: Personal computer
- Size: 65.5 KB - 140.9 KB, 509.0 (Mac OS X)
- Type: Programming game
- License: GPLv2, open-source
- Website: crobots.deepthought.it

Crobots is a programming game released for the first time by Tom Poindexter in December, 1985 as Shareware. It is an MS-DOS program for IBM PC and compatibles and was developed on x86-based Unix systems.

The robots are controlled by a program written in a stripped-down version of C. The robot's mission is to seek out and destroy other robots, each running different programs. The robots can be controlled in order to move around the battlefield, scan the environment to find enemies and fire at enemies using a cannon.

Crobots borrows the concept used from the game RobotWar that ran on the original Apple II computer. Robots were programmed in a proprietary programming language that was interpreted and included a real-time view of the game as it was played.

In October, 2013, Poindexter released the source code of Crobots under the GPLv2 free software license.

== Clones ==
There have been many Crobots clones made. However, very few of them are compiler and virtual machine at the same time; for example there are Java clones that use JVM and C++ clones that use a standard Microsoft compiler.

Proper clones have the same intrinsic functions as the original Tom Poindexter version; sometimes however the direction of angles is changed to match the standard C library's trigonometric functions. The most recent clones are Crobots64 and Netrobots.

Crobots64 by Marco Zora has a C++-subset compiler and a virtual machine with a graphical interface. New capabilities in this clone are cooperation between robots of the same species, the unlimited number of concurrent robots, the floating point math functions and the speed of the virtual CPU.

In contrast, Netrobots can run over a network with each robot running in a separate process, and each robot can be written in a different programming language.

== See also ==
- Core War
