= Color Robot Battle =

1981 video game

- Developer(s): The Image Producers
- Publisher(s): Radio Shack
- Designer(s): Glenn Sogge
- Programmer(s): Del Ogren
- Platform(s): TRS-80 Color Computer
- Release: 1981
- Genre(s): Programming

Color Robot Battle is a programming game developed by Glenn Sogge and Del Ogren for the TRS-80 Color Computer and published by Radio Shack in 1981.

== Robot Programming ==
The aim of the game is to write a computer program that controls a (simulated) robot. Two programs are selected to do battle in an arena with the last robot standing being the winner. One of the examples from the manual follows:

*OMEGA
ROB> =R:XM
WAL> =W:T-2
START> CROB:CWAL:F8:=?:T1
GSTART

The robot controlled by this program follows the wall of the arena making an occasional random turn to break the movement pattern. The program scans for an opponent and attacks if one is found.

== See also ==
- RobotWar
