= Wyszecki =

Wyszecki is a surname. Notable people with the surname include:

- Günter Wyszecki (1925–1985), German-Canadian physicist
- Wolfgang von Wyszecki (born 1959), German-Canadian actor, screenwriter, and producer

== See also ==
- Wysocki
