= Creeper and Reaper =

First computer worm and antivirus

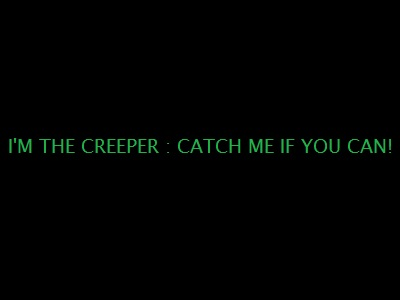
Screenshot of a Creeper simulation

Creeper was the first computer worm, while Reaper was the first antivirus software, designed to eliminate Creeper.

== Creeper ==
Creeper

Malware details
- Type: Computer worm
- Isolation date: 1971
- Authors: Bob Thomas, Ray Tomlinson

Technical details
- Platform: TENEX

Creeper was an experimental computer program written by Bob Thomas at BBN in 1971. Its original iteration was designed to move between DEC PDP-10 mainframe computers running the TENEX operating system using the ARPANET, with a later version by Ray Tomlinson designed to copy itself between computers rather than simply move. This self-replicating version of Creeper is generally accepted to be the first computer worm. Creeper was a test created to demonstrate the possibility of a self-replicating computer program that could spread to other computers.

The program was not actively malicious software, as it caused no damage to data, the only effect being a message it output to the teletype reading "I'M THE CREEPER : CATCH ME IF YOU CAN"

=== Impact ===
Creeper had a minimal impact on the computers it infected. No more than 28 machines could have been infected, as that was the number of machines running the TENEX operating system on ARPANET. The operators of the machines were also collaborators in the project, and Tomlinson needed permission to run the program on their machines. In an interview, Tomlinson also stated that there were no unintended effects from running the program.

== Reaper ==
Reaper
- Original author: Ray Tomlinson
- Release: 1972
- Operating system: TENEX

Reaper was the first anti-virus software, designed to delete Creeper by moving across the ARPANET. It was created by Tomlinson in 1972.

== Cultural ==
The conflict between Creeper and Reaper served as inspiration for the programming game Core War, while fictionalized versions of Reaper have been used as antagonists in the anime Digimon Tamers and the visual novel Digital: A Love Story. A digital Creeper has also appeared in the webcomic Internet Explorer, alongside the likewise personified Morris Worm.
