= Emma Vyssotsky =

American astronomer (1894–1975)

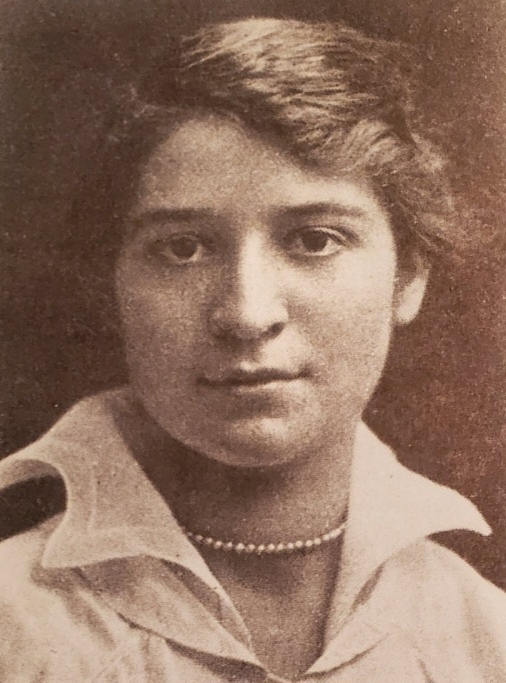
- Vyssotsky in 1927
- Born: Emma T. R. Williams; October 23, 1894; Media, Pennsylvania, U.S.
- Died: May 12, 1975 (aged 80); Winter Park, Florida, U.S.
- Education: Swarthmore College (BA); Harvard University (PhD)
- Spouse: Alexander Vyssotsky (m. 1929; died 1973)
- Children: Victor A. Vyssotsky
- Awards: Annie Jump Cannon Award in Astronomy (1946)
- Scientific career
- Fields: Astronomy
- Workplaces: Smith College; University of Virginia

Emma T. R. Williams Vyssotsky (born Emma T. R. Williams; October 23, 1894 – May 12, 1975) was an American astronomer who received the Annie J. Cannon Award in Astronomy in 1946.

== Biography ==
Emma T. R. Williams Vyssotsky was born Emma T. R. Williams on October 23, 1894, in Media, Pennsylvania. She earned a BA in mathematics from Swarthmore College in 1916. She worked at Smith College as an astronomy and mathematics demonstrator for a year before finding work at an insurance company as an actuary.

In 1927, after receiving a Whitney Fellowship and a Bartol Scholarship, she enrolled in astronomy at Radcliffe College (now part of Harvard University). There, she worked with Cecilia Payne on the "spectral line contours of hydrogen and ionized calcium throughout the spectral sequence."

Emma received her PhD in astronomy from Harvard College in 1930 for her dissertation titled A Spectrophotometric Study of A Stars. At the time, she was only the third individual to be awarded a PhD in astronomy from Harvard.

She followed her husband, astronomer Alexander Vyssotsky, to the University of Virginia, where he was offered a professorship; she was offered an instructor position. She spent her astronomy career at the McCormick Observatory at the university, where her specialty was the motion of stars and the kinematics of the Milky Way. The couple worked together.

She worked at the observatory for more than a decade before the university promoted her to professor in 1945, but by then she had taken a medical leave of absence after contracting a debilitating illness, Malta Fever, which restricted her activities. Still, she continued to publish.

== Personal life and death ==
Emma married the Russian-born astronomer Alexander Vyssotsky in 1929; they published jointly and worked together at the McCormick Observatory in Charlottesville, Virginia. They had one son, Victor A. Vyssotsky, a mathematician and computer scientist who was involved with Multics and co-created Darwin, the first programming game. She died on May 12, 1975, in Winter Park, Florida.

== Awards ==
In 1946, she was awarded the Annie J. Cannon Award in Astronomy by the American Astronomical Society in recognition of her contributions to the field of stellar spectra.

== Select publications ==
Emma published much of her research under the name E. T. Williams. She and her husband, Alexander, would alternate the lead author role on their joint papers, with her name appearing first sometimes, and his name appearing first at other times.

- Vyssotsky, E. T. W. (1929). A Spectrophotometric Study of A Stars (Doctoral dissertation, Radcliffe College).
- Vyssotsky, A. N.; Williams, Emma T. R. (1933). "Color Indices and Integrated Magnitudes of Fifteen Bright Globular Clusters". The Astrophysical Journal. 77: 301. Bibcode:1933ApJ....77..301V. doi:10.1086/143472.
- Vyssotsky, A. N.; Williams, Emma T. R. (1943). "Mccormick Spectral Statistics". The Astrophysical Journal. 98: 185. Bibcode:1943ApJ....98..185V. doi:10.1086/144558.
- Williams, Emma T. R.; Vyssotsky, A. N. (1946). "Distribution of faint red giants in galactic longitude as compared with faint a stars". The Astronomical Journal. 52: 51. Bibcode:1946AJ.....52Q..51W. doi:10.1086/105946.
- Vyssotsky, A. N. (1951). "An investigation of stellar motions - XII. An interpretation of peculiar motions in terms of galactic structure". The Astronomical Journal. 56: 62. Bibcode:1951AJ.....56...62V. doi:10.1086/106515.
