= Hellbore =

Hellbore could refer to:

- A heavy weapon in several science fiction series.
  - A turret-mounted weapon of the Bolo tanks in the Bolo novels written by Keith Laumer and David Weber.
  - A long-range weapon in the Starfleet Battles and Starfleet Command games.
  - A weapon in the Orion's Arm SF universe.
  - A weapon module in the second Star Control game.
  - A type of gravitational weapon in the Space Empires game series.
  - A type of weapon in the RoboWar game.
  - A large sized turreted weapon in the Starsector game.
- Hellebore, one of approximately 20 species of plants that belongs to the genus Helleborus
- Hellebore magazine, A popular folk horror magazine
