= Dirk Reuyl =

Dutch-American physicist and astronomer

Dirk Reuyl (1906 – 1972) was a Dutch American physicist and astronomer. He was the cousin of astronomer Peter van de Kamp.

== Life ==
Like his cousin, Reuijl (later "Reuyl") was born in Kampen, Overijssel. He studied physics and mathematics at Utrecht University, where, in October 1931, he defended his PhD dissertation "Photographic measures of close double stars" with Albertus Antonie Nijland as advisor. He came to the United States a few years before Van de Kamp. He joined the staff at McCormick Observatory in 1929 and continued to work there until 1944. He originally worked on the parallax of stars, first publishing a list of 50 measurements in 1929 with fellow staff member Alexander N. Vyssotsky. In 1941 he measured angular diameter of Mars using photographic plates.

== Claim of planets ==
In 1943 he claimed to have discovered (with Erik Holberg) a planetary companion of the star system 70 Ophiuchi and other stars. He claimed that this planetary object had 10 times the mass of the planet Jupiter and a 17-year orbital period. This caused quite a sensation at the time. A critical analysis by Wulff Heintz later discredited these claims.

== Later life and death ==
In 1944 he left McCormick Observatory and became head of the Photographic Division at the Ballistic Research Laboratory of the U.S. Army Aberdeen Proving Ground in Aberdeen, Maryland. He wrote a 1949 article for Sky and Telescope on guided missiles. During the late 1940s and the 1950s he worked on optically tracking the launch and trajectory of captured V-2 rockets. In 1957 Reuyl began a project for the optical tracking of the first artificial Earth satellites for the International Geophysical Year. This project was in association with the Smithsonian Astrophysical Observatory and tracked the first satellites launched by the U.S and Soviet Union. Reuyl remained associated with Aberdeen through the 1960s. He died in 1972.

== Honors and awards ==
Reuyl Crater, an impact crater on Mars, was named in his honor.
