= Alexander Vyssotsky =

Russian-American astronomer (1888–1973)

- Алекса́ндр Высо́тский
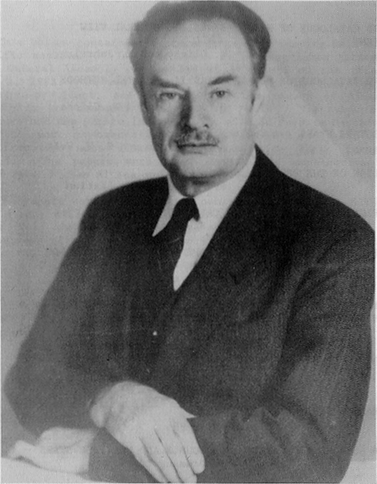
- Born: Alexander Nikolayevich Vyssotsky; 23 May 1888; Moscow, Russian Empire
- Died: 31 December 1973 (aged 85); Winter Park, Florida, U.S.
- Education: Moscow University
- Spouse: Emma Vyssotsky (m. 1929)
- Children: Victor A. Vyssotsky
- Scientific career
- Fields: Astronomy
- Workplaces: University of Virginia; American Astronomical Society

Alexander Nikolayevich Vyssotsky (Russian: Алекса́ндр Никола́евич Высо́тский; 23 May 1888 – 31 December 1973) was a Russian-American astronomer. He was professor at the University of Virginia, where he worked at the McCormick Observatory, and vice president of the American Astronomical Society.

== Early life ==
Alexander Nikolayevich Vyssotsky was born on 23 May 1888 in Moscow, in the Russian Empire. He spent his youth in the city, where he worked in a major observatory. He attended Moscow University.

He served in the Russian army and took part in World War I, where he used his knowledge of French, English, and German to translate intercepted radio communications. After the October Revolution, he joined the anti-communist White movement and, after its defeat, escaped to Turkey and then to Tunisia, where he worked as a science teacher. In 1923, he moved to the United States.

== Career ==
During his 35 years at the McCormick Observatory of the University of Virginia, he was sequentially promoted from instructor to assistant professor in 1928 and to professor in 1937. His best-known work is probably a star catalogue with five lists of stars titled Dwarf M Stars Found Spectrophotometrically. This work was important because it was the first list of nearby stars identified not by their motions in the sky but by their intrinsic, spectroscopic characteristics. Prior to this, most nearby stars had been identified by their large proper motions. However, not all stars close to the Sun have a large proper motion, and this selection criteria caused a bias in studies before the advent of Vyssotsky's catalogue.

Vyssotsky's survey was carried out at the McCormick Observatory using a 10-inch Cooke astrograph, donated by the Carnegie Institution of Washington and refigured by J. W. Fecker. It was used with an objective prism, which allowed spectra to be taken of all the stars in the field of view simultaneously. The spectra allowed Vyssotsky and others to classify the stars according to their surface temperature and gravity, and they identified thousands of dwarf M stars (which are intrinsically faint and therefore had to be nearby if they were visible through the 10-inch astrograph).

== Personal life and death ==
Alexander Vyssotsky married Emma Vyssotsky (née Williams), a fellow astronomer, in 1929. She was his lifelong scientific collaborator. They had one son, Victor A. Vyssotsky, a mathematician and computer scientist who was involved with Multics and co-created Darwin, the first programming game. Alexander Vyssotsky died on 31 December 1973 in Winter Park, Florida.
