= RobotWar =

1981 video game

- Publisher: Muse Software
- Programmer: Silas Warner
- Platforms: Apple II, PLATO
- Release: 1981
- Genre: Programming

RobotWar is a programming game written by Silas Warner. This game, along with the companion program RobotWrite, was originally developed in the TUTOR programming language on the PLATO system in the 1970s. Later the game was commercialized and adapted for the Apple II and published by Muse Software in 1981. The premise is that in the distant future of 2002, war was declared hazardous to human health, and now countries settled their differences in a battle arena full of combat robots. As the manual states, "The task set before you is: to program a robot, that no other robot can destroy!"

The main activity of the game is to write a computer program that operates a (simulated) robot. The player selects multiple robots which do battle in an arena until only one is left standing. The robots do not have direct knowledge of the location or velocity of any of the other robots; they only use radar pulses to deduce distance, and perhaps use clever programming techniques to deduce velocity. There is no way for the player to actually take part in the battle.

== Robot programming ==
The robots' language is similar to BASIC. There are 34 registers that can be used as variables or for the robots' I/O functions. An example program from the game manual is:

SCAN
  AIM + 5 TO AIM                    ; MOVE GUN
  AIM TO RADAR                      ; SEND RADAR PULSE
LOOP
  IF RADAR < 0 GOSUB FIRE           ; TEST RADAR
  GOTO SCAN
FIRE
  0 - RADAR TO SHOT                 ; FIRE THE GUN
  ENDSUB

The robot with this program sweeps its radar in a circle, firing off radar pulses, and when it detects another robot, fires a projectile set to explode at the correct distance as estimated by the radar pulse. This particular robot stands still throughout the entire battle, as it never assigns any number to its movement registers.

== Reception ==
Harry White reviewed RobotWar in The Space Gamer No. 45. White commented that "RobotWar is worth [...] the price. And if you don't have an Apple, but do own some other brand of personal computer, just wait - there'll be a similar game for you soon. It has to happen."

In its first issue Computer Gaming World praised RobotWar's language as easy to learn, and for several years hosted contests for robot programs. In 1996, the magazine named it the 85th best game ever. BYTE also praised Battle Language and its potential for teaching programming, as well as the sophisticated editor and debugger, but noted that the language's slow performance caused robots to sometimes behave in unexpected ways.

In a 2020 interview, Stewart Cheifet, the host and producer of Computer Chronicles told ZDNET that RobotWar was one of his favorite games, telling them "you didn't fight and shoot, you programmed your robot, it was a battle between the software, the robot you designed, and the robot the other guy designed,...it was brilliant."

== See also ==
- Color Robot Battle is a similar game for the TRS-80 Color Computer released in the same year.
- RoboWar is a similar game that was released later on the Macintosh.
- Crobots uses a simplified version of the 'C' programming language to program the robots.
- MindRover is a 2000 implementation of concepts taken from RobotWar and Robot Odyssey.
