= Fan Mountain Observatory =

Observatory in Virginia, US

- Organization: Astronomy Department, University of Virginia
- Observatory code: I18
- Location: Albemarle County, Virginia, United States
- Coordinates: 37°52′41.35″N 78°41′34.92″W
- Altitude: 566 m (1,857 ft)

Telescopes
- Fan Mountain Astrometric reflector: 40-inch reflector
- Fan Mountain Infrared reflector: 31-inch reflector
- Cooke astrograph: 10-inch astrograph

For the mountains in Tajikistan, see the Fann Mountains.

Fan Mountain Observatory (or Fan Mountain Station of Leander McCormick Observatory), an observatory operated by the Astronomy Department of the University of Virginia in southern Albemarle County, Virginia. It was opened in 1966 with a 31-inch (790 mm) Tinsley reflector, with a 40-inch (1,000 mm) Baker-Schmidt astrometric reflector following in 1972, to extend the parallax work of the McCormick Observatory, which was suffering from light pollution from growing Charlottesville, Virginia by this time.

== Description ==
Today both telescopes have been outfitted with state-of-the-art instruments and are operated nightly by university students and faculty. The primary instruments for the 40-inch (1,000 mm) telescope are a 2048x2048 SITe CCD for direct imaging and a fiber-fed visible wavelength spectrograph, FOBOS, for general spectroscopy and precision radial velocity measurement. The 31-inch (790 mm) telescope supports a 1024x1024 HAWAII-1 based HgCdTe infrared camera operating between 0.8 and 2.5 μm. This camera is capable of direct imaging in an 8.5 x 8.5' (2.5 x 2.5 mrad) field with 0.5" (2.4 μrad) pixels as well as polarimetry and grism spectroscopy.

== Viewing ==
Fan Mountain observatory hosts a "public night" twice each year when eyepieces are placed on the two telescopes for general viewing. At other times, the facility is closed to the public, including the grounds and road up to the observatory.

== See also ==
- List of observatories
- List of largest optical refracting telescopes
