= Freemacs =

- Original author(s): Russ Nelson
- Developer(s): Jim Hall
- Stable release: 1.6H / October 19, 2008; 16 years ago
- Operating system: MS-DOS, FreeDOS
- Type: Text editor
- License: GPL-1.0-only
- Website: www.ibiblio.org/pub/micro/pc-stuff/freedos/files/edit/emacs/

Freemacs is a small, programmable computer text editor for MS-DOS with some degree of compatibility with GNU Emacs. Written by Russ Nelson and later maintained by Jim Hall, Freemacs is currently distributed under the GPL-1.0-only license in the FreeDOS project.

Freemacs' executable binary, in the current 1.6 version, is only ~21k in size. Most features are implemented in MINT (Mint Is Not Trac), whose role is akin to that of Emacs Lisp as used by other implementations of Emacs.

The most recent version of Freemacs is 1.6H, released in 2008. Version 1.6G was released in 1999.
