= McCormick Observatory =

Astronomical observatory in Virginia, US

Leander McCormick Observatory
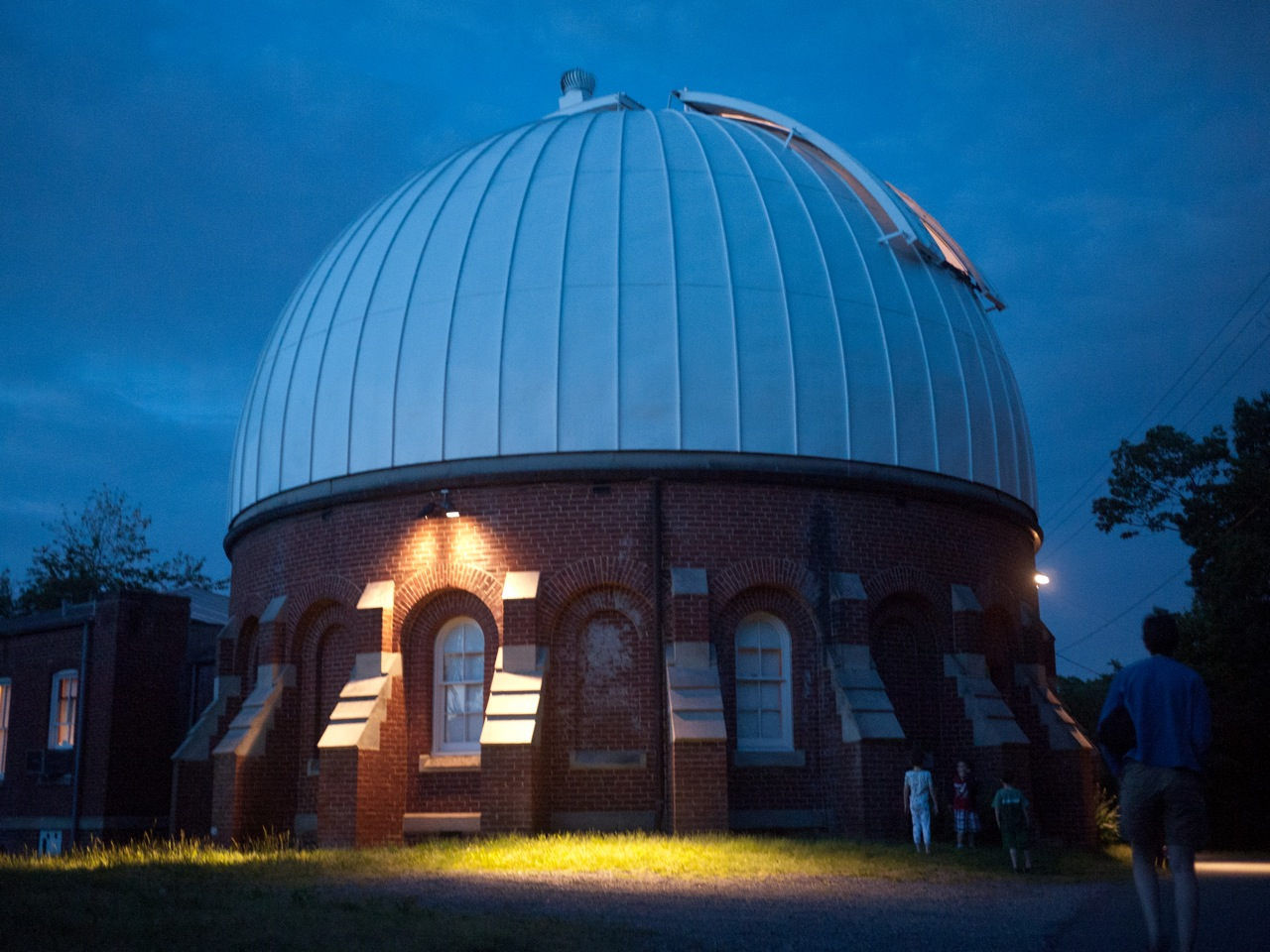
- Leander McCormick Observatory at night
- Alternative names: Leander McCormick Observatory
- Organization: Department of Astronomy, University of Virginia
- Observatory code: 780
- Location: Albemarle County, Virginia, US
- Coordinates: 38°1′58.2″N 78°31′20.4″W
- Altitude: 264 m (866 ft)
- Established: 1884
- Website: McCormick Observatory

Telescopes
- McCormick Telescope: 26-inch refractor
- Related media on Commons
- McCormick, Leander, Observatory
- U.S. National Register of Historic Places
- Virginia Landmarks Register
- Location within Virginia Location within the United States
- Location: 600 McCormick Rd., Charlottesville, Virginia
- Coordinates: 38°1′58.2″N 78°31′20.4″W
- Area: 1.3 acres (0.53 ha)
- Built: 1884
- Built by: Warner & Swasey (dome); George W. Spooner (house); Manois & Sons (lens casting); Alvan Clark and Sons (lens grinding)
- Architect: Wilson Bros
- Architectural style: Late Gothic Revival, Queen Anne
- NRHP reference No.: 04001245
- VLR No.: 002-1759

Significant dates
- Added to NRHP: November 19, 2004
- Designated VLR: March 17, 2004, September 29, 2006

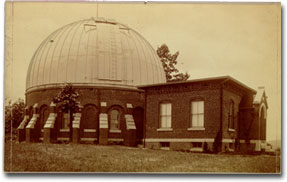
Leander McCormick Observatory in 1890

The Leander McCormick Observatory is one of the astronomical observatories operated by the Department of Astronomy of the University of Virginia, and is situated just outside Charlottesville, Virginia (US) in Albemarle County on the summit of Mount Jefferson (also known as Observatory Hill). It is named for Leander J. McCormick (1819–1900), who provided the funds for the telescope and observatory.

== History ==
=== Origin and construction ===
Leander McCormick was the son of Robert McCormick (1780–1846), the inventor of a mechanical reaper, and brother of Cyrus H. McCormick, who patented it and undertook the large scale manufacture and marketing of the invention. The McCormick family's homestead of Walnut Grove was located near Raphine, Virginia, although they moved to Chicago in 1848 to manufacture the reaper on a large scale. In Chicago, Cyrus, Leander and their brother William founded what became the McCormick Harvesting Machine Company and eventually International Harvester.

In 1870 Leander decided to donate the largest telescope in the world to his home state of Virginia. However, the financial impact of the American Civil War on Virginia as well as the impact of the Great Chicago Fire on his own finances, delayed his effort. In addition to the University of Virginia, for years he was also considering Washington College (later Washington and Lee University) in Lexington, Virginia, since it was located much closer to the family homestead. In 1870, Robert E. Lee, who was then president of Washington College, sent a letter of introduction to Joseph Henry, secretary of the Smithsonian Institution, making known McCormick's wishes to establish an astronomical observatory in the state. It was largely through the efforts of Charles Scott Venable (aide-de-camp to Gen. Robert E. Lee from 1862 to 1865 and professor of mathematics at the University of Virginia from 1865 to 1896) that McCormick finally decided to make his gift to the University of Virginia in 1877. In 1878, the University of Virginia officially received McCormick's donation of the telescope. This was followed in 1881 by a donation of $18,000 for the observatory itself, contingent on the University's raising the funds to endow the professorship.

The 66 cm refracting telescope was made by Alvan Clark & Sons of Cambridgeport, Massachusetts, who were regarded as the finest telescope makers of the age. At the time it was the equal largest telescope in the United States, and the second largest refractor in the world when completed. It was nearly a twin of the earlier 26-inch refractor at the U.S. Naval Observatory in Washington. However, the Clarks made some adjustments to the lens to improve the image quality over that of the Naval Observatory refractor. In 1877 while the McCormick Refractor was still in Cambridgeport, Alvan Clark used it to verify the discovery of the moons of Mars the night after the discovery observations were made by Asaph Hall with the Naval Observatory refractor.

The telescope and building were completed in 1884, and dedicated on April 13, 1885, Thomas Jefferson's birthday. The dome, at 45 feet, was the largest in the world when completed; it was designed by Warner and Swasey with a unique three shutter design.

=== Early years ===
The first published observations to be carried out at the Observatory, before the telescope was even complete, was of the Transit of Venus on December 6, 1882. Observations were made at the site of the observatory as well as at the Rotunda of the University of Virginia.

Under the first director, Ormond Stone, a program to measure the positions of southern stars was carried out (an extension on the Durchmusterung star catalogue to -23 degrees). In addition, the orbits of southern double stars were measured and southern nebulae were observed.

Starting in 1914 the second director, Samuel Alfred Mitchell, began a program to measure the distances to nearby stars (stellar parallax) using photography. This program continued under the next two directors, Harold Alden and Laurence Fredrick; over the course of more than 80 years, the distances to thousands of stars have been determined with the McCormick Refractor. Peter van de Kamp, Alexander N. Vyssotsky, Emma T. R. Williams and Dirk Reuyl also carried out research on the number and types of stars seen in different directions, and from this deduced information about the size and shape of the Milky Way.

== Today ==
The Observatory is now used primarily for teaching and public outreach, and contains a museum of the history of astronomy at the University of Virginia. The observational research of the Astronomy Department is carried out at Fan Mountain Observatory, and at other observatories.

Since the 1880s, daily weather observations have been taken at McCormick Observatory, and it has been part of the National Weather Service's Cooperative Observer Program (COOP) since the program's inception in 1890.

The telescope is the largest Alvan Clark refractor still mounted on its original Alvan Clark mount.

== See also ==
- List of astronomical observatories
- List of largest optical refracting telescopes
