= Plotutils =

Set of free software utilities and libraries for generating 2D plots

- Original authors: Robert Maier, Nick Tufillaro
- Developer: GNU Project
- Stable release: 2.6 / September 27, 2009; 16 years ago
- Operating system: Cross-platform
- License: GNU General Public License
- Website: gnu.org/software/plotutils

GNU plotutils is a set of free software command-line tools and software libraries for generating 2D plot graphics based on data sets. It is used in projects such as PSPP and UMLgraph, and in many areas of academic research, and is included in many Linux distributions such as Debian. Windows and Mac OS X versions are also available. The library provides bindings for the C and C++ languages. Its stand-alone command-line tools can generate graphs and perform numerical calculation of spline curves and systems of ordinary differential equations. Plotutils is a GNU package and is distributed under a free software licence, the GPL.

== History ==
Several utilities were inspired by Unix plotting utilities. A graph utility and various plot filters were present in the first releases of Unix from Bell Laboratories. By the time of Version 7 Unix, graph, plot, spline, and several device-dependent versions of libplot were standard Unix features. The first display device supported by the package was a Tektronix 611 storage scope. By the early 1980s, numerous other devices were supported.

In 1989, the first GNU versions of graph, plot, tek2plot, spline and their respective documentation were written. Richard Stallman further directed development of the programs and documentation. The distribution, as it stood in 1991, was distributed under the name GNU graphics.

In 1995, the package was significantly expanded by writing a device-independent, standalone version of libplot, and by rewriting graph from scratch, turning it into a real-time filter.

== Features ==
=== Stand alone tools ===
- GNU graph, which plots 2-D datasets or data streams in real time.
- GNU plot, which translates GNU Metafile format to any of the other formats.
- GNU tek2plot, for translating Tektronix 4010 data to any of the above formats.
- GNU pic2plot, for translating the pic language to any of the above formats.
- GNU plotfont, for displaying character maps of the fonts that are available in the above formats.
- GNU spline, which does spline interpolation of data.
- GNU ode, which numerically integrates a system consisting of one or more ordinary differential equations.

=== Supported output formats ===
- X Window System display
- Tektronix 4010
- SVG
- PNG
- PNM
- pseudo-GIF (using run-length encoding rather than LZW to avoid the past patent issue)
- WebCGM
- Adobe Illustrator
- PostScript
- PCL
- HP-GL
- xfig

== See also ==
- Graph (Unix)
- GNU Project
- gnuplot
