= Russ Nelson =

American computer programmer

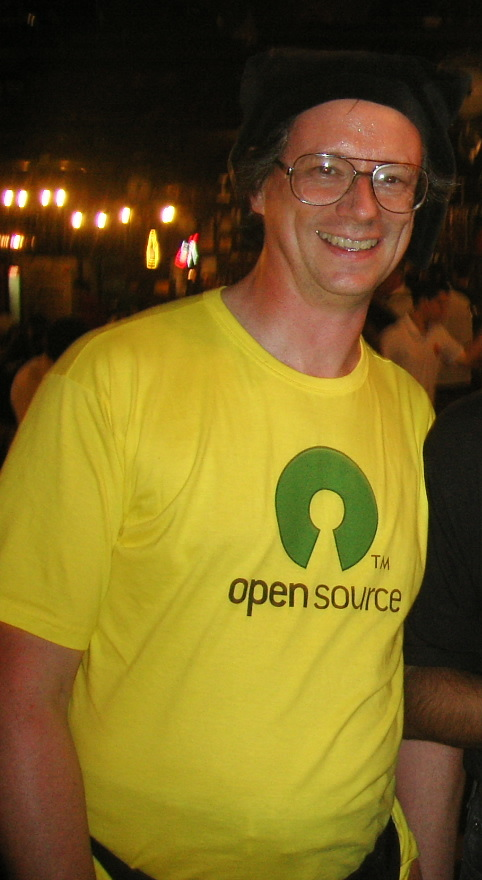
- Russ Nelson in 2005

Board of Directors, Open Source Initiative
- In office February 1998 – April 6, 2011
- Succeeded by: Jim Jagielski

President, Open Source Initiative
- In office February 1, 2005 – February 23, 2005
- Preceded by: Eric S. Raymond
- Succeeded by: Michael Tiemann

Personal details
- Born: March 21, 1958 (age 68)
- Party: Libertarian Party
- Occupation: Software developer
- Known for: Board member and former president of Open Source Initiative
- Website: http://russnelson.com/

Russell Nelson (born March 21, 1958) is an American computer programmer. He was a founding board member of the Open Source Initiative and briefly served as its president in 2005.

== Career ==
In 1983, Nelson and Patrick Naughton wrote Painter's Apprentice, a MacPaint clone. Nelson was the author of Freemacs (a variant of Emacs used by FreeDOS).

While attending university, Nelson began developing the collection of drivers later commercially released as the "Crynwr Collection". In 1991, Nelson founded Crynwr Software, a company located in Potsdam, New York, supporting deployment of large-scale e-mail systems, development of packet drivers, Linux kernel drivers, and reverse engineering of embedded systems.

In July 2010, Nelson was working on water quality sensors.

=== Open Source Initiative ===
In 1998, Nelson became one of the six first members of the board of directors of the Open Source Initiative.

On February 1, 2005, he was named as the new president of the Open Source Initiative, replacing Eric S. Raymond. On February 7, Nelson published a post to his personal blog titled "Blacks are lazy", which generated controversy. Nelson apologized to those who perceived the post (which he withdrew because it "was not well written") as racist. Nelson resigned as president in early March (the resignation was backdated to February 23), and stated he did not believe himself to be politically savvy enough for the role of president.

Nelson remained on the board of directors of the Open Source Initiative for another six years.

== Personal ==
Nelson is the son of Russell Edward Nelson and Gladys Jacobsen Nelson. Formerly a Quaker, for political reasons he no longer identifies as one, as of 2014. Nelson is a pacifist, and a member of the Libertarian Party of the United States.

Nelson created the first Quaker website in the world, quaker.org, in early 1995. He transferred the website to Friends Publishing Corporation, a Quaker nonprofit, in March 2018.
