= Maksim Vysotskiy =

Belarusian footballer

Personal information
- Date of birth: 29 January 1995 (age 31)
- Place of birth: Minsk, Belarus
- Height: 1.91 m (6 ft 3 in)
- Position: Goalkeeper

Youth career
- 2012–2015: Minsk

Senior career*
| Years | Team | Apps | (Gls) |
| 2014–2016 | Minsk | 0 | (0) |
| 2014 | → Minsk-2 | 18 | (0) |
| 2016 | → Torpedo Minsk (loan) | 3 | (0) |
| 2017 | Baranovichi | 15 | (0) |
| 2017 | → Naftan Novopolotsk (loan) | 10 | (0) |
| 2018 | Dnepr Mogilev | 13 | (0) |
| 2019 | Gorodeya | 4 | (0) |
| 2020 | Khimik Svetlogorsk | 21 | (0) |
| 2021 | Smorgon | 5 | (0) |
| 2021 | Isloch Minsk Raion | 1 | (0) |
| 2022 | Belshina Bobruisk | 5 | (0) |
| 2022–2023 | Molodechno | 22 | (0) |
| 2024 | Baranovichi | 13 | (0) |
- * Club domestic league appearances and goals as of 10 October 2024

Maksim Vysotskiy (Belarusian: Максім Высоцкі; Russian: Максим Высоцкий; born 29 January 1995) is a Belarusian professional footballer.
