= Vysotsky (inhabited locality) =

Vysotsky (Russian: Высоцкий; masculine), Vysotskaya (Высоцкая; feminine), or Vysotskoye (Высоцкое; neuter) is the name of several rural localities in Russia.

== Modern localities ==
- Vysotsky (rural locality), a settlement in Staroselsky Rural Administrative Okrug of Unechsky District in Bryansk Oblast; 52°50′N 33°9′E
- Vysotskoye, Kaluga Oblast, a village in Ferzikovsky District of Kaluga Oblast
- Vysotskoye, Opochetsky District, Pskov Oblast, a village in Opochetsky District of Pskov Oblast
- Vysotskoye, Pskovsky District, Pskov Oblast, a village in Pskovsky District of Pskov Oblast
- Vysotskoye (Shchukinskaya Rural Settlement), Pustoshkinsky District, Pskov Oblast, a village in Pustoshkinsky District of Pskov Oblast; municipally, a part of Shchukinskaya Rural Settlement of that district
- Vysotskoye (Alolskaya Rural Settlement), Pustoshkinsky District, Pskov Oblast, a village in Pustoshkinsky District of Pskov Oblast; municipally, a part of Alolskaya Rural Settlement of that district
- Vysotskoye, Stavropol Krai, a selo in Vysotsky Selsoviet of Petrovsky District in Stavropol Krai
- Vysotskoye, Kurkinsky District, Tula Oblast, a village in Krestovskaya Volost of Kurkinsky District in Tula Oblast
- Vysotskoye, Uzlovsky District, Tula Oblast, a selo in Fedorovskaya Rural Administration of Uzlovsky District in Tula Oblast
- Vysotskoye, Gavrilov-Yamsky District, Yaroslavl Oblast, a village in Stoginsky Rural Okrug of Gavrilov-Yamsky District in Yaroslavl Oblast
- Vysotskoye, Yaroslavsky District, Yaroslavl Oblast, a selo in Lyutovsky Rural Okrug of Yaroslavsky District in Yaroslavl Oblast
- Vysotskaya, Tyumen Oblast, a village in Prokutkinsky Rural Okrug of Ishimsky District in Tyumen Oblast
- Vysotskaya, Yaroslavl Oblast, a village in Okhotinsky Rural Okrug of Myshkinsky District in Yaroslavl Oblast

== Alternative names ==
- Vysotskoye, alternative name of Vysokoye, a selo in Morachevsky Rural Administrative Okrug of Zhiryatinsky District in Bryansk Oblast; 53°16′N 33°35′E
