= Wysocki =

Wysocki (feminine: Wysocka, plural: Wysoccy) is a surname of Polish origin. Notable people with the surname include:

== Military people ==
- Antoni Wysocki (1884–1940), member of the Greater Poland Uprising
- Józef Wysocki (1809–1873), Polish general
- Piotr Wysocki (1797–1875), Polish lieutenant
- Władysław Wysocki (1908–1943), Polish soldier

== Performers ==
- Ben Wysocki (born 1984), American drummer for the rock band The Fray
- Jacob Wysocki (born 1990), American actor and comedian
- Jon Wysocki (born 1971), American drummer for the rock band Staind

== Scientists ==
- Charles Wysocki (biologist), American biologist and psychologist
- Vicki Wysocki, American chemist

== Sportspeople ==
- Adam Wysocki (born 1974), Polish sprint canoeist
- Erin Wysocki-Jones (born 1992), British Paralympic coxswain
- John Wysocki (1916–1965), American football player
- Konrad Wysocki (born 1982), Polish-German basketball player
- Mariusz Wysocki (born 1976), Polish soccer player
- Pete Wysocki (1948–2003), American football player
- Przemysław Wysocki (born 1989), Polish soccer player
- Ricky Wysocki (born 1993), American professional disc golfer
- Ruth Wysocki (born 1957), American runner

== Others ==
- Alfred Wysocki (1873–1959), Polish lawyer and diplomat
- Charles Wysocki (artist) (1928–2002), American painter
- Jonathan Wysocki (born 1976), American writer, director and producer
- Lucian Wysocki (1899–1964), German Nazi Party politician, Police President
- Mary Anne Wysocki, victim of Tony Costa
- Mikolaj Wysocki (1595–1650), Polish Evangelical theologian
- Sheila Wysocki
- Wiesław Wysocki (born 1950), Polish historian
- Zdzisław Wysocki (born 1944), Polish composer

== Fictional characters ==
- Bert "Sock" Wysocki, Reaper TV series character
- Jarek Wysocki, The Chicago Code character
- Vonda Wysocki, The Chicago Code character

== Other ==
- Wysocki coat of arms
- Wysocki, Masovian Voivodeship, Poland
- Wysocki Młyn, Kuyavian-Pomeranian Voivodeship, Poland

== See also ==
- Vysotsky (disambiguation)
