= Douglas McIlroy =

American computer scientist (born 1932)

Malcolm Douglas McIlroy
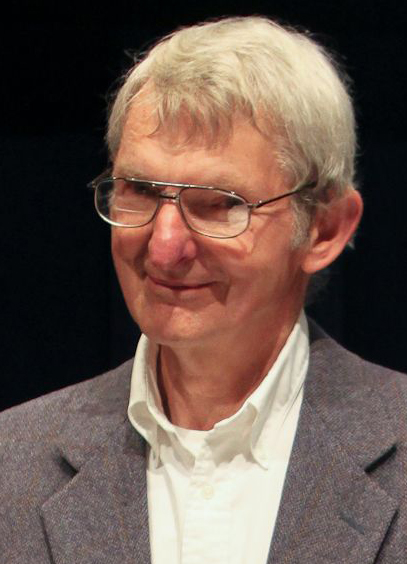
- McIlroy at the Japan Prize Foundation in 2011
- Born: Malcolm Douglas McIlroy; April 24, 1932 (age 94); Newburgh, New York, U.S.
- Education: Cornell University (BS); Massachusetts Institute of Technology (PhD)
- Known for: Macros; Unix pipelines; Unix philosophy; Software componentry; echo; diff; sort; join; RUNOFF; tr; Unix manual; Darwin (1961)
- Scientific career
- Fields: Computer science; mathematics; engineering
- Workplaces: Dartmouth College; Bell Labs; Oxford University; Association for Computing Machinery
- Thesis: On the Solution of the Differential Equations of Conical Shells (1959)
- Doctoral advisors: Eric Reissner
- Website: www.cs.dartmouth.edu/~doug/

Malcolm Douglas McIlroy (born April 24, 1932) is an American computer scientist, mathematician, and programmer. As of 2019 he is an Adjunct Professor of Computer Science at Dartmouth College. McIlroy is best known for having originally proposed Unix pipelines and developed several Unix tools, such as echo, spell, diff, sort, join, graph, speak, and tr. He was also one of the pioneering researchers of macro processors and programming language extensibility. He participated in the design of multiple influential programming languages, particularly PL/I, SNOBOL, ALTRAN, TMG and C++.

His seminal work on software componentization and code reuse makes him a pioneer of component-based software engineering and software product line engineering.

== Biography ==
Malcolm Douglas McIlroy was born on April 24, 1932, in Newburgh, New York. He earned his bachelor's degree in engineering physics from Cornell University, and a Ph.D. in applied mathematics from MIT in 1959 for his thesis On the Solution of the Differential Equations of Conical Shells (advisor Eric Reissner). He taught at MIT from 1954 to 1958.

McIlroy joined Bell Laboratories in 1958; from 1965 to 1986 was head of its Computing Techniques Research Department (the birthplace of the Unix operating system), and thereafter was Distinguished Member of Technical Staff.

From 1967 to 1968, McIlroy also served as a visiting lecturer at Oxford University.

In 1997, McIlroy retired from Bell Labs, and took a position as an adjunct professor in the Dartmouth College Computer Science Department.

He has previously served the Association for Computing Machinery as national lecturer, Turing Award chairman, member of the publications planning committee, and associate editor for the Communications of the ACM, the Journal of the ACM, and ACM Transactions on Programming Languages and Systems. He also served on the executive committee of CSNET.

== Research and contributions ==
=== Macro processors ===
McIlroy is considered to be a pioneer of macro processors. In 1959, together with Douglas E. Eastwood of Bell Labs, he introduced conditional and recursive macros into popular SAP assembler, creating what is known as Macro SAP. His 1960 paper was also seminal in the area of extending any (including high-level) programming languages through macro processors. These contributions started the macro-language tradition at Bell Labs ("everything from L6 and AMBIT to C"). McIlroy's macro processing ideas were also the main inspiration for TRAC macro processor.

He also coauthored M6 macro processor in FORTRAN IV, which was used in ALTRAN and later was ported to and included into early versions of Unix.

=== Contributions to Unix ===
Throughout the 1960s and 1970s McIlroy contributed programs for Multics (such as RUNOFF) and Unix operating systems (such as diff, echo, tr, join and look), versions of which are widespread to this day through adoption of the POSIX standard and Unix-like operating systems. He introduced the idea of Unix pipelines. He also implemented TMG compiler-compiler in PDP-7 and PDP-11 assembly, which became the first high-level programming language running on Unix, prompting development and influencing Ken Thompson's B programming language and Stephen Johnson's Yacc parser-generator.

McIlroy also took over from Dennis Ritchie compilation of the Unix manual "as a labor of love". Particularly, he edited volume 1 of the manual pages for Version 7 Unix. According to Sandy Fraser: "The fact that there was a manual, that he [McIlroy] insisted on a high standard for the manual, meant that he insisted on a high standard for every one of the programs that was documented".

=== Computer language design ===
McIlroy influenced the design and implementation of SNOBOL programming language. His string manipulation macros were used extensively in the initial SNOBOL implementation of 1962, and figured prominently in subsequent work, eventually leading to its machine-independent implementation language SIL. The table type (associative array) was added to SNOBOL4 on McIlroy's insistence in 1969.

In 1960s, he participated in the design of PL/I programming language. He was a member of the IBM–SHARE committee that designed the language and, together with Robert Morris, wrote the Early PL/I (EPL) compiler in TMG for the Multics project.

Around 1965, McIlroy, together with W. Stanley Brown, implemented the original version of ALTRAN programming language for IBM 7094 computers.

McIlroy has also made a significant influence on design of the programming language C++ (e.g., he proposed the stream output operator <<).

=== Algorithms ===
In the 1990s, McIlroy worked on improving sorting techniques, particularly he co-authored an optimized qsort with Jon Bentley.

In 1969, he contributed an efficient algorithm to generate all spanning trees in a graph (first discovered by George J. Minty in 1965).

=== Darwin ===
In 1961, together with Victor A. Vyssotsky and Robert Morris, McIlroy co-created Darwin, the first programming game, on an IBM 7090 at Bell Labs.

== Awards and recognition ==
In 1995, he was elected as a Fellow of the American Association for the Advancement of Science. In 2004, he won both the USENIX Lifetime Achievement Award ("The Flame") and its Software Tools User Group (STUG) award. In 2006, he was elected as a member of the National Academy of Engineering.

== Views on computing ==
McIlroy is attributed the quote "The real hero of programming is the one who writes negative code," where the meaning of negative code is taken to be similar to the famous Apple developer, Bill Atkinson, team anecdote (i.e., when a change in a program source makes the number of lines of code decrease ('negative' code), while its overall quality, readability or speed improves).

== See also ==
- Homoiconicity
