= Victor A. Vyssotsky =

American mathematician and computer scientist (1931–2012)

- Born: Victor Alexander Vyssotsky; February 26, 1931; Charlottesville, Virginia, U.S.
- Died: December 24, 2012 (aged 81); Orleans, Massachusetts, U.S.
- Known for: Multics; Darwin (1961)
- Parents: Alexander Vyssotsky (father); Emma Williams (mother)
- Scientific career
- Fields: Mathematics; computer science
- Workplaces: Bell Labs

Victor Alexander Vyssotsky (February 26, 1931 – December 24, 2012) was an American mathematician and computer scientist. He is best known for his work on Multics and for co-creating Darwin, the first programming game.

== Life and career ==
Victor Alexander Vyssotsky was born on February 26, 1931, in Charlottesville, Virginia, to astronomers Alexander and Emma Vyssotsky (née Williams).

He was the technical head of the Multics project at Bell Labs and later executive director of Research in the Information Systems Division of AT&T Bell Labs. Multics directly inspired Ken Thompson to develop Unix. Later, Vyssotsky was the founding director of Digital's Cambridge Research Lab.

Vyssotsky co-created the BLODI Block Diagram Compiler in 1960 at Bell Labs. In 1961, together with Robert Morris and Douglas McIlroy, he co-created Darwin, the first programming game, on an IBM 7090 at Bell Labs.

Vyssotsky died on December 24, 2012, in Orleans, Massachusetts.
