= Robert Morris (cryptographer) =

American cryptographer (1932–2011)

- Born: July 25, 1932; Boston, Massachusetts, U.S.
- Died: June 26, 2011 (aged 78); Lebanon, New Hampshire, U.S.
- Education: Harvard University
- Known for: Multics; Unix; Darwin (1961)
- Spouse: Anne Farlow
- Children: 3, including Robert Tappan Morris
- Scientific career
- Fields: Cryptography; computer science; mathematics
- Workplaces: National Security Agency; Bell Labs

Robert Morris (July 25, 1932 – June 26, 2011) was an American cryptographer and computer scientist. He is best known for his work on Multics and Unix and for co-creating Darwin, the first programming game.

== Early life and education ==
Robert Morris was born on July 25, 1932, in Boston, Massachusetts, to Walter W. Morris, a salesman, and Helen Kelly Morris, a homemaker. He received a bachelor's degree in mathematics in 1957 and a master's degree in applied mathematics in 1958 from Harvard University.

== Career ==
=== Bell Labs ===
From 1960 until 1986, Morris was a researcher at Bell Labs and worked on Multics and later Unix.

Using the TMG compiler-compiler, Morris, together with Douglas McIlroy, developed the early implementation of the PL/I compiler called EPL for the Multics project. The pair also contributed a version of runoff text-formatting program for Multics.

Morris's contributions to early versions of Unix include the math library, the dc programming language, the program crypt, and the password encryption scheme used for user authentication. The encryption scheme (invented by Roger Needham), was based on using a trapdoor function (now called a key derivation function) to compute hashes of user passwords which were stored in the file /etc/passwd; analogous techniques, relying on different functions, are still in use today.

In 1961, together with Victor A. Vyssotsky and Douglas McIlroy, Morris co-created Darwin, the first programming game, on an IBM 7090.

=== National Security Agency ===
In 1986, Morris began work at the National Security Agency (NSA). He served as chief scientist of the NSA's National Computer Security Center, where he was involved in the production of the Rainbow Series of computer security standards, and retired from the NSA in 1994. He once told a reporter that, while at the NSA, he helped the FBI decode encrypted evidence.

There is a description of Morris in Clifford Stoll's book The Cuckoo's Egg. Many readers of Stoll's book remember Morris for giving Stoll a challenging mathematical puzzle (originally due to John H. Conway) in the course of their discussions on computer security: What is the next number in the sequence 1 11 21 1211 111221? (known as the look-and-say sequence). Stoll was unaware of the answer to this puzzle at the time and remained unaware when writing The Cuckoo's Egg and thus did not reveal the answer in his book.

== Personal life and death ==
Robert Morris married Anne Farlow, and they had three children together: Robert Tappan Morris, Meredith Morris, and Benjamin Morris. Robert Tappan Morris created the Morris worm in 1988, which is considered the first computer worm on the Internet.

Robert Morris died on June 26, 2011, in Lebanon, New Hampshire.

== Selected publications ==
- with Grampp, Frederick T. (October 1984). "The UNIX System: UNIX Operating System Security". AT&T Bell Laboratories Technical Journal. 63 (8): 1649–1672. doi:10.1002/j.1538-7305.1984.tb00058.x.
