= Programming game =

Video game genre

A programming game is a video game that incorporates elements of computer programming, enabling the player to direct otherwise autonomous units within the game to follow commands in a domain-specific programming language, often represented as a visual language to simplify the programming metaphor. Programming games broadly fall into two areas: single-player games where the programming elements either make up part of or the whole of a puzzle video game, and multiplayer games where the player's automated program is pitted against other players' programs.

== Origins ==
The first programming game was Darwin, created in 1961 at Bell Labs by Victor A. Vyssotsky, Robert Morris, and Douglas McIlroy. It was a competitive game in which players sought to destroy each other's program.

== As puzzle games ==
Programming games have been used as part of puzzle games, challenging the player to achieve a specific result once the program starts operating. Early games in the genre include System 15000 and Hacker. Another example of such a game is SpaceChem, where the player must use its visual language to manipulate two waldos as to disassemble and reassemble chemical molecules. In such games, players are able to test and debug their program as often as necessary until they find a solution that works. Many of these games encourage the player to find the most efficient program, measured by the number of timesteps needed or number of commands required. Other similar games include Human Resource Machine, Infinifactory, and TIS-100. Zachtronics is a video game development company known for its programming-centric puzzle games.

Other games incorporate the elements of programming as portions of puzzles in the larger game. For example, Hack 'n' Slash include a metaphor of being able to access the internal programs and variables of objects represented in the game world, pausing the rest of the game as the player engages this programming interface, and modify the object's program as to progress further; this might be changing the state of an object from being indestructible to destructible. Other similar games with this type of programming approach include Transistor, else Heart.Break(), Glitchspace, and Pony Island.

Another approach used in some graphical games with programming elements is to present the player with a command line interface to issue orders via a domain-specific language to direct objects within the game, allowing the player to reissue commands as the situation changes rather than crafting a pre-made program. Games like Quadrilateral Cowboy and Duskers have the user command several small robotic creatures in tandem through the language of code to reach a certain goal. Hackmud presents the player with a simulated mainframe interface through which they issue commands to progress forward.

== As competitive games ==
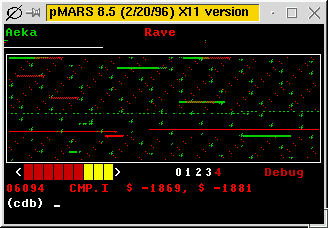
A game of Core War in progress

Many programming games involve controlling entities, such as robots, tanks or bacteria, that seek to destroy each other. Such games can be considered environments of digital organisms and related to artificial life simulations. The first programming game, Darwin (1961), was designed in this way. Another early example is Core War (1984), where programs written in a standardized assembly-like language battle for space in a finite memory (virtual magnetic cores). Players are given tools to develop and test out their programs within the game's domain-specific language before submitting the program to a central server. The server then executes the program against others and reports the results to the player, from which they can make changes or improvements to the program.

There are different tournaments and leagues for the programming games where the characters can compete with each other. Usually a script is optimized for a special strategy. Similar approaches are used for more traditional games; the World Computer Chess Championship consists of matches between programs written for the abstract strategy game of chess.

The competitive programming game has also found its way to various board games such as RoboRally or Robot Turtles, typically where a program becomes a premade deck of playing cards played one by one to execute that code.

Researchers presented RoboCode as a "problem-based learning" substrate for teaching programming.

== Related areas ==
Open world games that feature the ability for players to construct environments from an array of building blocks have often been used by more advanced players to construct logic circuits and more advanced programs from the fundamental blocks. Minecraft is one such example, as while the game provides a limited set of blocks that mimic switches and electric circuits, users have been able to create basic functional computers within the virtual world, and at least one modification is aimed to teach children how to program on the virtual computer in a simplistic language.

Several sites, such as Codecademy, help to teach real-world programming languages through gamification, where video game principles are used to motivate the user.

== See also ==
- List of digital organism simulators
- Visual programming language
- Zachtronics
