= Comparison of programming languages =

Programming languages are used for controlling the behavior of a machine (often a computer). Like natural languages, programming languages follow rules for syntax and semantics.

There are thousands of programming languages with new ones developed annually. While few languages achieve widespread adoption, professional programmers may use multiple languages throughout their career.

Most programming languages are not standardized by an international (or national) standard, even widely used ones, such as Perl or Standard ML (despite the name). Notable standardized programming languages include ALGOL, C, C++, JavaScript (under the name ECMAScript), Smalltalk, Prolog, Common Lisp, Scheme (IEEE standard), ISLISP, Ada, Fortran, COBOL, SQL, and XQuery.

== General comparison ==
The following table compares general and technical information for a selection of commonly used programming languages. See the individual languages' articles for further information.

Language	Original purpose	Imperative	Object-oriented	Functional	Procedural	Generic	Reflective	Other paradigms	Standardized
1C:Enterprise programming language	Application, RAD, business, general, web, mobile	Yes	No	Yes	Yes	Yes	Yes	Object-based, Prototype-based programming	No
ActionScript	Application, client-side, web	Yes	Yes	Yes	Yes	No	No	prototype-based	Yes; 1999-2003, ActionScript 1.0 with ES3, ActionScript 2.0 with ES3 and partial ES4 draft, ActionScript 3.0 with ES4 draft, ActionScript 3.0 with E4X
Ada	Application, embedded, realtime, system	Yes	Yes	No	Yes	Yes	No	Concurrent, distributed	Yes; 1983, 2005, 2012, ANSI, ISO, GOST 27831-88
Aldor	Highly domain-specific, symbolic computing	Yes	Yes	Yes	No	No	No		No
ALGOL 58	Application	Yes	No	No	No	No	No		No
ALGOL 60	Application	Yes	No	No	Yes	Yes	No		Yes; 1960, IFIP WG 2.1, ISO
ALGOL 68	Application	Yes	No	Yes	Yes	Yes	No	Concurrent	Yes; 1968, IFIP WG 2.1, GOST 27974-88,
Ateji PX	Parallel application	No	Yes	No	No	No	No	pi calculus	No
APL	Application, data processing	Yes	Yes	Yes	Yes	Yes	Yes	Array-oriented, tacit	Yes; 1989, ISO
Assembly language	General	Yes	No	No	No	No	No	Any, syntax is usually highly specific, related to the target processor	Yes; 1985 IEEE 694-1985
AutoHotkey	GUI automation (macros), highly domain-specific	Yes	Yes	No	Yes	No	No		No
AutoIt	GUI automation (macros), highly domain-specific	Yes	No	No	Yes	No	No		No
Ballerina	Integration, agile, server-side, general	Yes	Yes	Yes	Yes	No	No	Concurrent, transactional, statically and strongly typed, diagrammatic–visual	De facto standard via Ballerina Language Specification
Bash	Shell, scripting	Yes	No	No	Yes	No	No		Optionally; POSIX.2
BASIC	Application, education	Yes	No	No	Yes	No	No		Yes; 1983, ANSI, ISO, ECMA
BeanShell	Application, scripting	Yes	Yes	Yes	No	No	Yes		No; In progress, JCP
BLISS	System	No	No	No	Yes	No	No		No
BlitzMax	Application, game	Yes	Yes	No	Yes	No	Yes		No
Boo	Application, game scripting	No	Yes	No	No	No	No		No
C	Application, system, general purpose, low-level operations	Yes	No	No	Yes	No	No		Yes; 1989, ANSI C89, ISO/IEC C90, ISO/IEC C95, ISO/IEC C99, ISO/IEC C11, ISO/IEC C17, ISO/IEC C23
C++	Application, system	Yes	Yes	Yes	Yes	Yes	Yes	Concurrent	Yes; 1998, ISO/IEC C++98, ISO/IEC C++03, ISO/IEC C++11, ISO/IEC C++14, ISO/IEC C++17, ISO/IEC C++20, ISO/IEC C++23, ISO/IEC C++26
C#	Application, RAD, business, client-side, general, server-side, web, game programming	Yes	Yes	Yes	Yes	Yes	Yes	Concurrent, structured	Yes; 2000, ECMA, ISO
Carbon	Experimental successor language to C++, designed by Google for performance-critical software	Yes	Yes	Yes	Yes	Yes	No	Multi-paradigm	No
Clarion	General, business, web	Yes	Yes	Yes	No	No	No		Unknown
Clean	General	No	No	Yes	No	Yes	No		No
Clojure	General	No	No	Yes	No	No	No	Concurrent	No
CLU	General	Yes	Yes	No	Yes	Yes	No		No
COBOL	Application, business	Yes	Yes	No	Yes	No	No		Yes; 1968 ANSI X3.23, 1974, 1985; ISO/IEC 1989:1985, 2002, 2014, 2023
Cobra	Application, business, general, web	Yes	Yes	Yes	No	Yes	Yes		No
ColdFusion (CFML)	Web	No	Yes	No	Yes	No	No		No
Common Lisp	General	Yes	Yes	Yes	Yes	Yes	Yes	Extensible syntax, Array-oriented, syntactic macros, multiple dispatch, concurrent	Yes; 1994, ANSI
COMAL 80	Education	Yes	No	No	Yes	No	No		No
Crystal	General purpose	Yes	Yes	Yes	Yes	Yes	No	Concurrent	No
Curry	Application	No	No	Yes	No	Yes	No	lazy evaluation, non-determinism	De facto standard via Curry Language Report
Cython	Application, general, numerical computing	Yes	Yes	Yes	No	No	Yes	Aspect-oriented	No
D	Application, system	Yes	Yes	Yes	Yes	Yes	Yes	Generative, concurrent	No
Dart	Application, web, server-side, mobile, IoT	Yes	Yes	Yes	Yes	Yes	No	Structured	Yes; ECMA-408 standard
Delphi, Object Pascal	General purpose	Yes	Yes	Yes	Yes	Yes	Yes		Unknown
Dylan	Application	No	Yes	Yes	No	No	No		No
Eiffel	General, application, business, client-side, server-side, web (EWF)	Yes	Yes	Yes	No	Yes	Yes Erl-G	Distributed SCOOP, Void-safe	Yes; 2005, ECMA, ISO
ELAN	Education	Yes	No	No	Yes	No	No	Structured, stepwise refinement	No
Elixir	Application, distributed	No	No	Yes	No	No	Yes	Concurrent, distributed	No
Erlang	Application, distributed	No	No	Yes	No	No	Yes	Concurrent, distributed	No
Euphoria	Application	No	No	No	Yes	No	Yes		No
Factor	General	Yes	No	Can be viewed as	No	Yes	Yes	Stack-oriented	No
FP		No	No	Yes	No	No	No		No
F#	Application	Yes	Yes	Yes	Yes	Yes	Yes		No
Forth	General	Yes	No	No	Yes	No	Yes	Stack-oriented	Yes; 1994, ANSI
Fortran	Application, numerical computing	Yes	Yes	Yes	Yes	Yes	No	Array-based, vectorized, concurrent, native distributed/shared-memory parallelism	Yes; 1966, ANSI 66, ANSI 77, MIL-STD-1753, ISO 90, ISO 95, ISO 2003, ISO/IEC 1539-1:2010 (2008), ISO/IEC JTC1/SC22/WG5 N2145 (2018)
FreeBASIC	Application, numerical computing	Yes	Yes	No	Yes	Yes	No		No
Gambas	Application	Yes	Yes	No	No	No	No		No
Game Maker Language	Application, game programming	Yes	Yes	No	No	No	No		No
GLBasic	Application, games	Yes	Yes	No	Yes	No	No	Simple object-oriented	No
Go	Application, web, server-side	Yes	Can be viewed as	Can be viewed as	Yes	Yes	Yes	Concurrent	De facto standard via Go Language Specification
Gosu	Application, general, scripting, web	Yes	Yes	No	No	Yes	Yes		No
GraphTalk	Application	No	Yes	No	No	No	No	Logic	No
Groovy	Application, general, scripting, web	Yes	Yes	Yes	Yes	Yes	Yes	Meta-programming	No; In progress, JCP
Harbour	Application, business, data processing, general, web	Yes	Yes	Yes	Yes	Yes	Yes	Declarative	No
Haskell	Application	No	No	Yes	No	Yes	No	Lazy evaluation	Yes; 2010, Haskell 2010
Haxe	Application, general, web	Yes	Yes	Yes	No	Yes	Yes		No
HyperTalk	Application, RAD, general	Yes	No	No	Yes	No	Yes	Weakly typed	Unknown
Io	Application, host-driven scripting	Yes	Yes	No	No	No	No		No
IPL	General	No	No	Yes	No	No	No		Unknown
ISLISP	General	Yes	Yes	Yes	No	Yes	No		Yes; 1997, 2007, ISO
J	Application, data processing	Yes	Yes	Yes	Yes	Yes	Yes	Array-oriented, function-level, tacit, concurrent	No
JADE	Application, distributed	Yes	Yes	No	No	No	No		No
Java	Application, business, client-side, general, mobile development, server-side, web	Yes	Yes	Yes	Yes	Yes	Yes	Concurrent	De facto standard via Java Language Specification
JavaScript	Client-side, server-side, web	Yes	Yes	Yes	Yes	No	Yes	prototype-based	Yes; ECMA-262 standard
Joy	Research	No	No	Yes	No	No	No	Stack-oriented	No
jq	"awk for JSON"	No	No	Yes	No	No	No	Tacit, Backtracking, Streaming, PEG	No
Julia	General, technical computing	Yes	Can be viewed as	Yes	Yes	Yes	Yes	Multiple dispatch, meta, scalar and array-oriented, parallel, concurrent, distributed ("cloud")	De facto standard via Julia Documentation
K	Data processing, business	No	No	No	No	No	No	Array-oriented, tacit	Unknown
Kotlin	Application, general, mobile development, server-side, client-side, web, scripting, domain-specific	Yes	Yes	Yes	Yes	Yes	Yes	Concurrent	De facto standard via Kotlin Language Specification
Ksh	Shell, scripting	Yes	Yes	No	Yes	No	No	Several variants, custom programmable, dynamic loadable modules	Optionally; POSIX.2
LabVIEW (G)	Application, industrial instrumentation-automation	Yes	Yes	Yes	No	No	No	Dataflow, visual	No
Lisp	General	No	No	Yes	No	No	No		Unknown
LiveCode	Application, RAD, general	Yes	Yes	No	Yes	No	Yes	Weakly typed	No
Logtalk	Artificial intelligence, application	No	Yes	No	No	No	Yes	Logic	No
Linden Scripting Language (LSL)	Virtual worlds content scripting and animation	Yes	No	No	Yes	No	No	Scripts exist in in-world objects	De facto reference is the Second Life implementation of LSL.
Lua	Application, embedded scripting	Yes	Yes	Yes	Yes	No	Yes	Aspect-oriented, prototype-based	No
Maple	Symbolic computation, numerical computing	Yes	Yes	Yes	Yes	No	No	Distributed	No
Mathematica	Symbolic language	Yes	Yes	Yes	Yes	Yes	Yes	Logic, distributed	No
MATLAB	Highly domain-specific, numerical computing	Yes	Yes	No	Yes	No	No		No
Modula-2	Application, system	Yes	No	No	No	Yes	No		Yes; 1996, ISO
Modula-3	Application	Yes	Yes	No	No	Yes	No		No
MUMPS (M)	General, application, databases	Yes	Approved for next Standard	No	Yes	Partially Thru Indirection and Xecute	Yes	Concurrent, multi-user, NoSQL, transaction processing	Yes; 1977 ANSI, 1995, ISO 2020
Nim	Application, general, web, scripting, system	Yes	Yes	Yes	Yes	Yes	Yes	Multiple dispatch, concurrent, meta	No
Oberon	Application, system	Yes	Yes	No	No	No	No		No
Object Pascal	Application, general, mobile app, web	Yes	Yes	No	Yes	Yes	Yes	Structured	No
Objective-C	Application, general	Yes	Yes	No	Yes	No	Yes	Concurrent	No
OCaml	Application, general	Yes	Yes	Yes	Yes	Yes	No		No
Occam	General	Yes	No	No	Yes	No	No	Concurrent, process-oriented	No
Opa	Web applications	Yes	No	Yes	No	Yes	No	Distributed	No
OpenLisp	General, Embedded Lisp Engine	Yes	Yes	Yes	No	Yes	No		Optionally; ISLISP
Oxygene	Application	Yes	Yes	No	No	Yes	No		No
Oz-Mozart	Application, distribution, education	Yes	Yes	Yes	No	No	No	Concurrent, logic	No
Pascal	Application, education	Yes	No	No	Yes	No	No		Yes; 1983, ISO
Perl	Application, scripting, text processing, Web	Yes	Yes	Yes	Yes	Yes	Yes		No
PHP	Server-side, web application, web	Yes	Yes	Yes	Yes	No	Yes		De facto standard via language specification and Requests for Comments (RFCs)
PL/I	Application	Yes	Yes	No	Yes	No	No		Yes; 1969, ECMA-50 (1976)
Plus	Application, system development	Yes	No	No	Yes	No	No		No
PostScript	Graphics, page description	Yes	No	No	Yes	No	No	Concatenative, stack-oriented	De facto standard via the PostScript Reference Manual
PowerShell	Administration, application, general, scripting	Yes	Yes	Yes	Yes	No	Yes	Pipeline	No
Prolog	Application, artificial intelligence	No	No	Yes	Yes	No	Yes	Logic, declarative	Yes; 1995, ISO/IEC 13211-1:1995, TC1 2007, TC2 2012, TC3 2017
PureBasic	Application	Yes	No	No	Yes	No	No		No
Python	Application, general, web, scripting, artificial intelligence, scientific computing	Yes	Yes	Yes	Yes	Yes	Yes	Aspect-oriented	De facto standard via Python Enhancement Proposals (PEPs)
R	Application, statistics	Yes	Yes	Yes	Yes	No	Yes		No
Racket	Education, general, scripting	Yes	Yes	Yes	Yes	No	Yes	Modular, logic, meta	No
Raku	Scripting, text processing, glue	Yes	Yes	Yes	Yes	Yes	Yes	Aspect-oriented, array, lazy evaluation, multiple dispatch, metaprogramming	No
REALbasic	Application	No	No	No	Yes	No	No		Unknown
Rebol	Distributed	Yes	Yes	Yes	Yes	No	Yes	Dialected	No
REXX	Scripting	Yes	Yes (NetRexx and Object REXX dialects)	No	Yes	No	No		Yes; 1996 (ANSI X3.274-1996)
RPG	Application, system	Yes	No	No	Yes	No	No		No
Ruby	Application, scripting, web	Yes	Yes	Yes	No	No	Yes	Aspect-oriented	Yes; 2011(JIS X 3017), 2012(ISO/IEC 30170)
Rust	Application, server-side, system, web	Yes	Can be viewed as	Yes	Yes	Yes	Yes for compile-time reflection; otherwise provides macros	Concurrent	De facto standard by the official Rust releases
S	Application, statistics	Yes	Yes	Yes	Yes	No	No		No
S-Lang	Application, numerical, scripting	Yes	No	No	Yes	No	No		No
Scala	Application, general, parallel, distributed, web	Yes	Yes	Yes	No	Yes	Yes	Data-oriented programming, metaprogramming	De facto standard via Scala Language Specification (SLS)
Scheme	Education, general	Yes	No	Yes	No	No	No	meta, extensible-syntax	De facto 1975-2013, R^{0}RS, R^{1}RS, R^{2}RS, R^{3}RS, R^{4}RS, R^{5}RS, R^{6}RS, R^{7}RS Small Edition
Seed7	Application, general, scripting, web	Yes	Yes	No	No	Yes	Yes	Multi-paradigm, extensible, structured	No
Simula	Education, general	Yes	Yes	No	No	No	No	discrete event simulation, multi-threaded (quasi-parallel) program execution	Yes; 1968
Small Basic	Application, education, games	Yes	No	No	No	No	No	Component-oriented	No
Smalltalk	Application, general, business, artificial intelligence, education, web	Yes	Yes	Yes	Yes	No	Yes	Concurrent, declarative	Yes; 1998, ANSI
SNOBOL	Text processing	No	No	No	No	No	No		Unknown
Splice	Embedded, general, portabillity	Yes	No	No	Yes	No	No	Bytecode VM	No
Standard ML	Application	Yes	No	Yes	No	Yes	No		Yes; 1997, SML '97
Swift	Application, general	Yes	Yes	Yes	Yes	Yes	Yes	Concurrent, declarative, protocol-oriented	No
Tcl	Application, scripting, web	Yes	Yes	Yes	Yes	No	Yes		No
V (Vlang)	Application, general, system, game, web, server-side	Yes	Can be viewed as	Can be viewed as	Yes	Yes	Yes	Concurrent	No
Visual Basic	Application, RAD, education, business, general, (Includes VBA), office automation	Yes	Yes	No	Yes	Yes	No	Component-oriented	No
Visual Basic .NET	Application, RAD, education, web, business, general	Yes	Yes	Yes	Yes	Yes	Yes	Structured, concurrent	No
Visual FoxPro	Application	Yes	Yes	No	Yes	No	No	Data-centric, logic	No
Visual Prolog	Application	Yes	Yes	Yes	No	No	No	Declarative, logic	No
Wolfram Language	Symbolic language	Yes	No	Yes	Yes	Yes	Yes	Logic, distributed	No
XL		Yes	Yes	No	No	No	No	concept programming	No
Xojo	Application, RAD, general, web	Yes	Yes	No	Yes	No	Yes		No
XPath/XQuery	Databases, data processing, scripting	No	No	Yes	No	No	No	Tree-oriented	Yes; 1999 W3C XPath 1, 2010 W3C XQuery 1, 2014 W3C XPath/XQuery 3.0
Zeek	Domain-specific, application	Yes	No	No	No	No	No		No
Zig	Application, general, system	Yes	No	Yes	Yes	Yes	Yes	Concurrent	No
Zsh	Shell, scripting	Yes	No	No	Yes	No	No	Loadable modules	Optionally; POSIX.2

== Failsafe I/O and system calls ==
Most programming languages will print an error message or throw an exception if an input/output operation or other system call (e.g., chmod, kill) fails, unless the programmer has explicitly arranged for different handling of these events. Thus, these languages fail safely in this regard.

Some (mostly older) languages require that programmers explicitly add checks for these kinds of errors. Psychologically, different cognitive biases (e.g., optimism bias) may affect novices and experts alike and lead them to skip these checks. This can lead to erroneous behavior.

Failsafe I/O is a feature of 1C:Enterprise, Ada (exceptions), ALGOL (exceptions or return value depending on function), Ballerina, C#, C++ (std::print() throws on failed operations), Common Lisp ("conditions and restarts" system), Curry, D (throwing on failure), Erlang, Fortran, Go (unless result explicitly ignored), Gosu, Harbour, Haskell, ISLISP, Java, Julia, Kotlin, LabVIEW, Mathematica, Objective-C (exceptions), OCaml (exceptions), OpenLisp, PHP, Python, Raku, Rebol, Rexx (with optional signal on... trap handling), Ruby, Rust (unless result explicitly ignored), Scala, Smalltalk, Standard ML, Swift ≥ 2.0 (exceptions), Tcl, Visual Basic, Visual Basic (.NET), Visual Prolog, Wolfram Language, Xojo, XPath/XQuery (exceptions), and Zeek.

No Failsafe I/O: AutoHotkey (global ErrorLevel must be explicitly checked), C, COBOL, Eiffel (it actually depends on the library and it is not defined by the language), GLBasic (will generally cause program to crash), RPG, Lua (some functions do not warn or throw exceptions), and Perl.

Some I/O checking is built in C++'s older I/O libraries (iostreams throw on failure, but C APIs like stdio or POSIX do not). Object Pascal, in Bash it is optional.

== Expressiveness ==
Language	Statements ratio	Lines ratio
C	1	1
C++	2.5	1
Fortran	2	0.8
Java	2.5	1.5
Perl	6	6
Smalltalk	6	6.25
Python	6	6.5

The literature on programming languages contains an abundance of informal claims about their relative expressive power, but there is no framework for formalizing such statements nor for deriving interesting consequences. This table provides two measures of expressiveness from two different sources. An additional measure of expressiveness, in GZip bytes, can be found on the Computer Language Benchmarks Game.

== Benchmarks ==
Barplot of log-time to produce a 1600^{2} Mandelbrot as reported in The Benchmarks Game

Benchmarks are designed to mimic a particular type of workload on a component or system. The computer programs used for compiling some of the benchmark data in this section may not have been fully optimized, and the relevance of the data is disputed. The most accurate benchmarks are those that are customized to your particular situation. Other people's benchmark data may have some value to others, but proper interpretation brings many challenges. The Computer Language Benchmarks Game site warns against over-generalizing from benchmark data, but contains a large number of micro-benchmarks of reader-contributed code snippets, with an interface that generates various charts and tables comparing specific programming languages and types of tests.

== Timeline of specific language comparisons ==
- 1974 – Comparative Notes on Algol 68 and PL/I – S. H. Valentine – November 1974
- 1976 – Evaluation of ALGOL 68, JOVIAL J3B, Pascal, Simula 67, and TACPOL Versus TINMAN – Requirements for a Common High Order Programming Language.
- 1977 – A comparison of PASCAL and ALGOL 68 – Andrew S. Tanenbaum – June 1977.
- 1993 – Five Little Languages and How They Grew – BLISS, Pascal, ALGOL 68, BCPL & C – Dennis M. Ritchie – April 1993.
- 2009 – On Go – oh, go on – How well will Google's Go stand up against Brand X programming language? – David Given – November 2009

== See also ==
- Comparison of programming languages (basic instructions)
- Comparison of programming languages (syntax)
- Comparison of integrated development environments
- Comparison of multi-paradigm programming languages
- TIOBE index
