= Rank (disambiguation) =

A rank is a position in a hierarchy. It may also refer to:

== Places ==
- Rank, Iran, a village
- Rank, Nepal, a village development committee

== People ==
- Rank (surname), a list of people with the name

== Arts and entertainment ==
- Rank (album), a live album by the Smiths
- "Rank", a song from the album A Bugged Out Mix by Artwork
- Rank, a set of pipes in a pipe organ
- Rank (chess), a row on a chessboard
- Rank (film), a short film directed by David Yates

== Businesses ==
- The Rank Group plc, European gaming and leisure business
  - The Rank Organisation, a British entertainment company formed in 1937, now part of the Rank Group
- Rank Group Limited, an investment company owned by Graeme Hart

== Computing and technology ==
- Rank (computer programming)
  - Rank (J programming language)
- Memory rank, or ranking, of computer memory, a set of DRAM chips connected to the same chip select, and which are able to be accessed simultaneously

== Mathematics and statistics ==
- Rank (linear algebra), dimension of the column space of a matrix
- Rank test, statistical test based on the rank of data when they are sorted
- Rank of an elliptic curve, the size of a smallest torsion-free generating set for the group of rational points on an elliptic curve.

== Other uses ==
- Rank (formation), a line of soldiers standing abreast
- RANK, receptor activator of nuclear factor κ B, a type I membrane protein
- Rank, a grade of coal

== See also ==
- Ranking
