= Aug =

Aug or AUG may refer to:

- Agricultural University of Georgia, Tbilisi
- Applicative Universal Grammar, a linguistic theory
- Aug., the abbreviation of August, the eighth month of the year in the Gregorian calendar
- Aug, the IMA symbol for the pyroxene mineral Augite
- AUG, the most common start codon, often encoding the amino acid methionine
- Augusta Railroad, defunct Arkansas railroad
- Augusta State Airport in Augusta, Maine (IATA Code: AUG)
- Steyr AUG, an assault rifle
- Atheist Union of Greece, a non-profit organization

== People ==
- Andrus Aug (born 1972), Estonian road bicycle racer

== Music ==
- aug, an augmented triad chord
- Aug (band), a New Jersey metal band
