= President (corporate title) =

Leader of an organization

Occupation
- Names: President
- Occupation type: Employment
- Activity sectors: Business

Description
- Competencies: Leadership, financial skills
- Related jobs: CEO, executive officer, vice president, managing director, representative director, COO, general manager, chairman, vice-chairman, mayor

A president is a leader of an organization, company, community, club, trade union, university, country or other group. The relationship between a president and a chief executive officer varies, depending on the structure of the specific organization. In a similar vein to a chief operating officer, the title of corporate president as a separate position (as opposed to being combined with a "C-suite" designation, such as "president and chief executive officer" or "president and chief operating officer") is also loosely defined; the president is usually the legally recognized highest rank of corporate officer, ranking above the various vice presidents (including senior vice president and executive vice president), but on its own generally considered subordinate, in practice, to the CEO. The powers of a president vary widely across organizations and such powers come from specific authorization in the bylaws like Robert's Rules of Order (e.g. the president can make an "executive decision" only if the bylaws allow for it).

== History ==
Originally, the term president was used in the same way that foreman or overseer is used now (the term is still used in that sense today). It has now also come to mean "chief officer" in terms of administrative or executive duties.

== Powers and authority ==
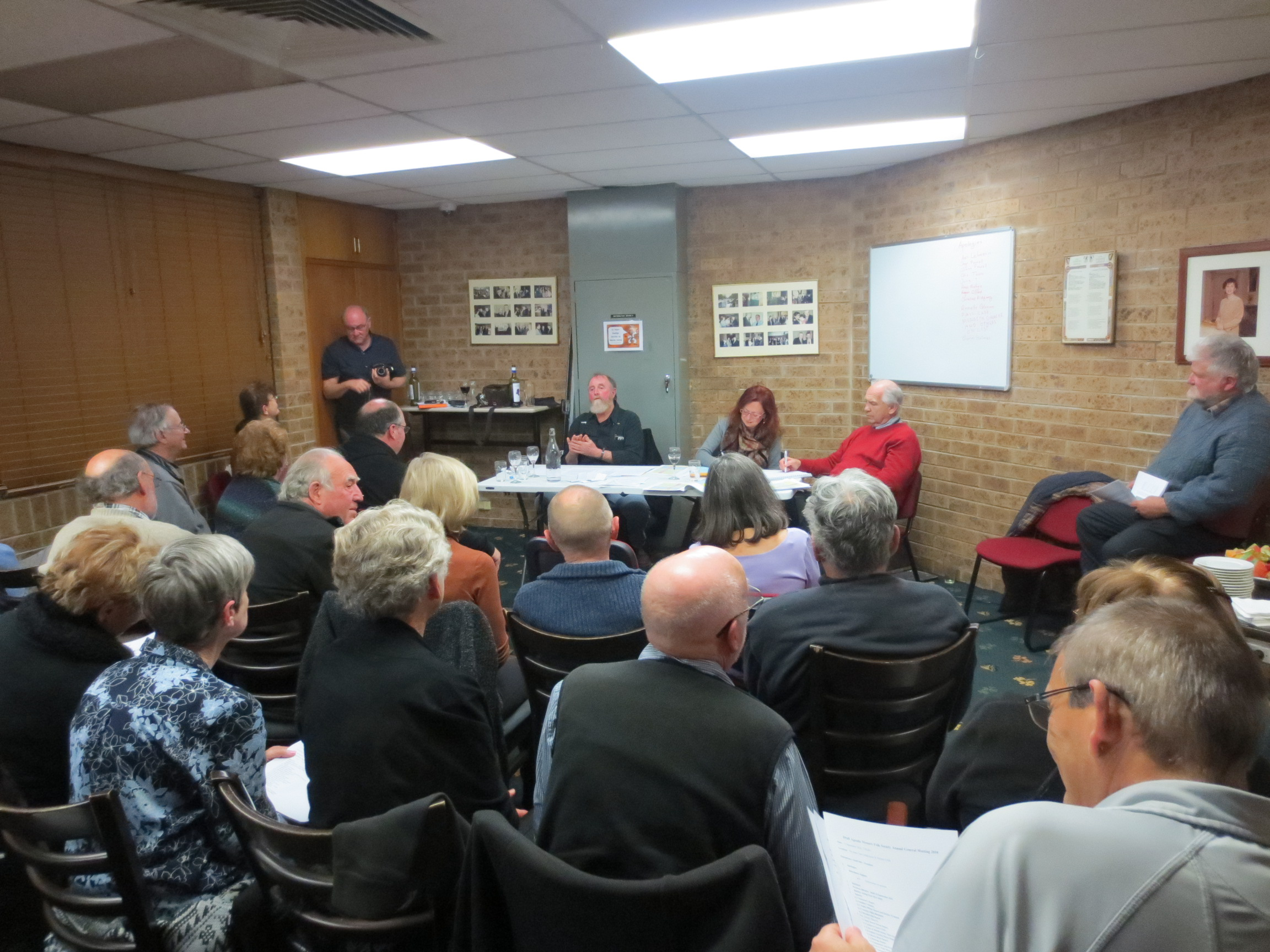
President presiding over the AGM of a small volunteer organization. President sitting at the left of table in the background.

The powers of the president vary widely across organizations. In some organizations the president has the authority to hire staff and make financial decisions, while in others the president only makes recommendations to a board of directors, and still others the president has no executive powers and is mainly a spokesperson for the organization. The amount of power given to the president depends on the type of organization, its structure, and the rules it has created for itself.

In addition to administrative or executive duties in organizations, a president has the duties of presiding over meetings. Such duties at meetings include:

- calling the meeting to order
- determining if a quorum is present
- announcing the items on the order of business or agenda as they come up
- recognition of members to have the floor
- enforcing the rules of the group
- putting all questions (motions) to a vote
- adjourning the meeting

While presiding, a president remains impartial and does not interrupt speakers if a speaker has the floor and is following the rules of the group. In committees or small boards, the president votes along with the other members. However, in assemblies or larger boards, the president should vote only when it can affect the result. At a meeting, the president only has one vote (i.e. the president cannot vote twice and cannot override the decision of the group unless the organisation has specifically given the president such authority).

== Disciplinary procedures ==
If the president exceeds the given authority, engages in misconduct, or fails to perform the duties, the president may face disciplinary procedures. Such procedures may include censure, suspension, or removal from office. The rules of the particular organization would provide details on who can perform these disciplinary procedures and the extent that they can be done. Usually, whoever appointed or elected the president has the power to discipline this officer.

== President-elect ==
Some organizations may have a position of president-elect in addition to the position of president. Generally the membership of the organization elects a president-elect and when the term of the outgoing president is complete, the president-elect automatically becomes president.

== Immediate past president ==
Some organizations may have a position of immediate past president in addition to the position of president. In those organizations, when the term of the president is complete, that person automatically fills the position of immediate past president. The organization can have such a position only if the bylaws provide it. The duties of such a position would also have to be provided in the bylaws.

== Life president ==
Life president is an honorary title often given to someone who has already served the organization for a long period in a major role.

== Poland ==
In Poland, due to the fact that there is a "civil law" system instead of "common law", the equivalent of "CEO" is "President of the Management Board".
