= Top Rank (disambiguation) =

Top Rank is a boxing promotion company in Las Vegas, US.

Top Rank may also refer to:

- Top Rank Records, 1950s subsidiary record label of the Rank Organisation in Britain
- Top Rank Suite, a former chain of nightclubs in the UK

== See also ==
- Rank (disambiguation)
- Ranking
