= Applicative programming language =

In the classification of programming languages, an applicative programming language is built out of functions applied to arguments. Applicative languages are functional, and applicative is often used as a synonym for functional. However, concatenative languages can be functional, while not being applicative.

The semantics of applicative languages are based on beta reduction of terms, and Side effect such as mutation of state are not permitted.

Lisp and ML are applicative programming languages.

== See also ==
- Applicative universal grammar
- Function-level programming
