= Joy (programming language) =

Programming language

- Paradigm: Multi-paradigm: functional, concatenative, stack-oriented
- Designed by: Manfred von Thun
- Developer: Manfred von Thun; John Cowan
- First appeared: 2001
- Stable release: March 17, 2003 / March 17, 2003
- Typing discipline: Strong, dynamic

Major implementations
- Joy0, Joy1, "Current Joy", "John Cowan's Joy", "JoyJ (Joy in jvmm)"

Influenced by
- Scheme, FP, Forth

Influenced
- Factor, Cat, V, Trith

Joy is a purely functional programming language that was produced by Manfred von Thun of La Trobe University in Melbourne, Australia. Joy is based on composition of functions rather than the lambda calculus. It was inspired by the function-level programming style of John Backus's FP.

== Overview ==
Functions in Joy lack formal parameters, instead functions implicitly operate on a stack. For example, a function that squares a numeric input can be expressed as follows:

DEFINE square == dup * .

The square function makes a copy of the top element with dup, and then multiplies the two top elements of the stack with *, leaving the square of the original top element at the top of the stack, with no need for a formal parameter. This makes Joy concise, as illustrated by this definition of quicksort:

DEFINE qsort ==
  [small]
  []
  [uncons [>] split]
  [swapd cons concat]
  binrec.

== Mathematical purity ==
Joy is a concatenative programming language: "The concatenation of two programs denotes the composition of the functions denoted by the two programs".

== See also ==
- RPL
- Concatenative programming language
- Lisp
