= Sebastian Shaumyan =

Armenian-American linguist (1916–2007)

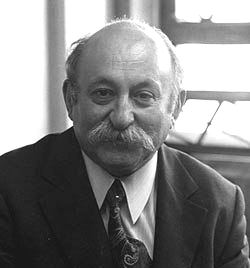
- Born: February 27, 1916; Tbilisi, Russian Empire (present-day Georgia)
- Died: January 21, 2007 (aged 90); London, United Kingdom

Philosophical work
- School: Structural Linguistics, Semiotics
- Main interests: Theoretical Linguistics, semiotics, philosophy of Science

Sebastian Konstantinovich Shaumyan (Armenian: Սեբաստյան Շահումյան; February 27, 1916 – January 21, 2007) was a Georgian-born Armenian-American theoretical linguist and an outspoken adherent of structuralist analysis.

== Biography ==
He was born in Tbilisi, the polyglot capital of the Russian Empire's territories in the Transcaucasus, on February 14, 1916, (although the shift to the Gregorian calendar a couple of years later made his birthday February 27). A sickly child, he was mostly tutored at home until he took a course in chemistry at a vocational school.

Having learnt German and English in addition to his Armenian, Georgian and Russian, Shaumyan took his degree in philology at Tbilisi State University. At some time in the late 1930s he came across Ferdinand de Saussure's Course in General Linguistics (1916) and, captivated, knew his academic course was set.

World War II briefly interrupted his scholarly aspirations, as he became embroiled in the battles for twice Nazi-occupied Kerch. He applied for a front-line posting, but instead he was sent to the Main Intelligence Unit in Moscow (GRU), where he was permitted to pursue his studies. He was a Party member and, with a post at Moscow State University, used his position to help, and sometimes to shelter, those who might be accused of the various crimes of formalism or idealism.

Shaumyan published Structural Linguistics in 1965 and founded the Section of Structural Linguistics at the Institute of Russian Language in Moscow, where he co-wrote many works with Polina Arkadyevna Soboleva. He promoted the work of Roman Jakobson and Nikolai Trubetzkoy, both of whom were out of favour (one an émigré, the other a prince). He also defended the "formalist", Noam Chomsky, (whom later he vigorously assailed) in Fundamentals of the Generative Grammar of Russian (1958), and Applicational Generative Model and Transformational Calculus of Russian (1963), both written with Soboleva.

In 1968 Shaumyan spent a year in Edinburgh and in 1975 was able to join the wave of Jewish emigration permitted at that time, joining Yale's faculty of linguistics.

Shaumyan's theory of applicative grammar was developed, reinforced, and extended in Applicational Grammar as a Semiotic Theory of Natural Language, (1977); in A Semiotic Theory of Language (1987); and finally in Signs, Mind, and Reality (2006, in the series Advances in Consciousness Research), with the intriguing subtitle A Theory of Language As the Folk Model of the World.

To his chagrin, he was superannuated by Yale in 1986, but maintained, as emeritus, a vigorous and very productive retirement. His bibliography contains a dozen books, some two hundred papers, and he was active on the conference circuit. In 2005, approaching 90, he returned to Moscow as a Fulbright scholar (but was refused a visa for a longer stay.)

Shaumyan's later work is marked by a broad interest in the philosophy of science, in foundational questions of linguistics and in related but separate studies of consciousness theory, and neurolinguistics. It is sharply critical of Chomsky, who Shaumyan saw as being unable to properly delineate what pertains to the study of linguistics proper. The list of languages cited in his last book gives evidence of the breadth of his interests; they include Basque, the endangered Australian language of Dyirbal, and the extinct Oregon Indian Takelma.

== Applicative Universal Grammar (AUG) ==
The core of Shaumyan's linguistic theory is Applicative Universal Grammar or AUG. The theory was first introduced in his book Strukturnaja lingvistika (Structural Linguistics), published in Moscow in 1965. AUG is based on combinatorial logic and grammatical categories which are built from two primitive universal types, called a term (T) and a sentence (S), which exist in every language. A term represents a noun or a noun phrase: for example "dog", "a dog", "a big dog" would all be considered terms. "A dog runs" would be a complete sentence. The verb "runs" is an operator that acts upon the operand term "a dog" and transforms it into a complete sentence "a dog runs". In Shaumyan's operator notation the verb "runs" would be represented symbolically as OTS. AUG has been used in computational linguistics in the development of a natural language parsing program, using the programming language Haskell.
