= Aug (band) =

- Origin: New Jersey, United States
- Genres: Heavy metal, hard rock
- Years active: 2008–present
- Labels: ARRT Records
- Members: Aug; Rich Tanis; Russ LaMater; Tommy Shauger
- Website: augrocknewjersey.wix.com

Aug is a hard rock band from New Jersey. The band was formed in 2008 and have since released two albums and have opened for many bands including King's X, Savatage and Joe Lynn Turner. The band is also notable for the lead singer's voice, which is similar to Ozzy Osbourne. The band has appeared in the program That Metal Show.

The band released its debut album, entitled 20 Years in Hell. In 2014, the band released its second album, entitled Be Careful What You Wish For.

== Band members ==
Current members

- Aug (Anthony Agostine) – vocals
- Rich Tanis – bass, backing vocals
- Tommy Shauger – lead guitar, vocals
- Russ LaMater – drums, percussion

== Discography ==
- 20 Years In Hell (2011)
- Be Careful What You Wish For (2014)
