= Rank, Iran =

Rank رانك
- Village
- Location within Iran
- Coordinates: 25°37′38″N 61°05′44″E
- Country: Iran
- Province: Sistan and Baluchestan
- County: Chabahar
- Bakhsh: Polan
- Rural District: Polan

Population (2006)
  - Total: 304
- Time zone: UTC+3:30 (IRST)
  - Summer (DST): UTC+4:30 (IRDT)

Rank (Persian: رانك, also Romanized as Rānk) is a village in Polan Rural District, Polan District, Chabahar County, Sistan and Baluchestan Province, Iran. At the 2006 census, its population was 304, in 54 families.
