= Rank =

Position in a hierarchy

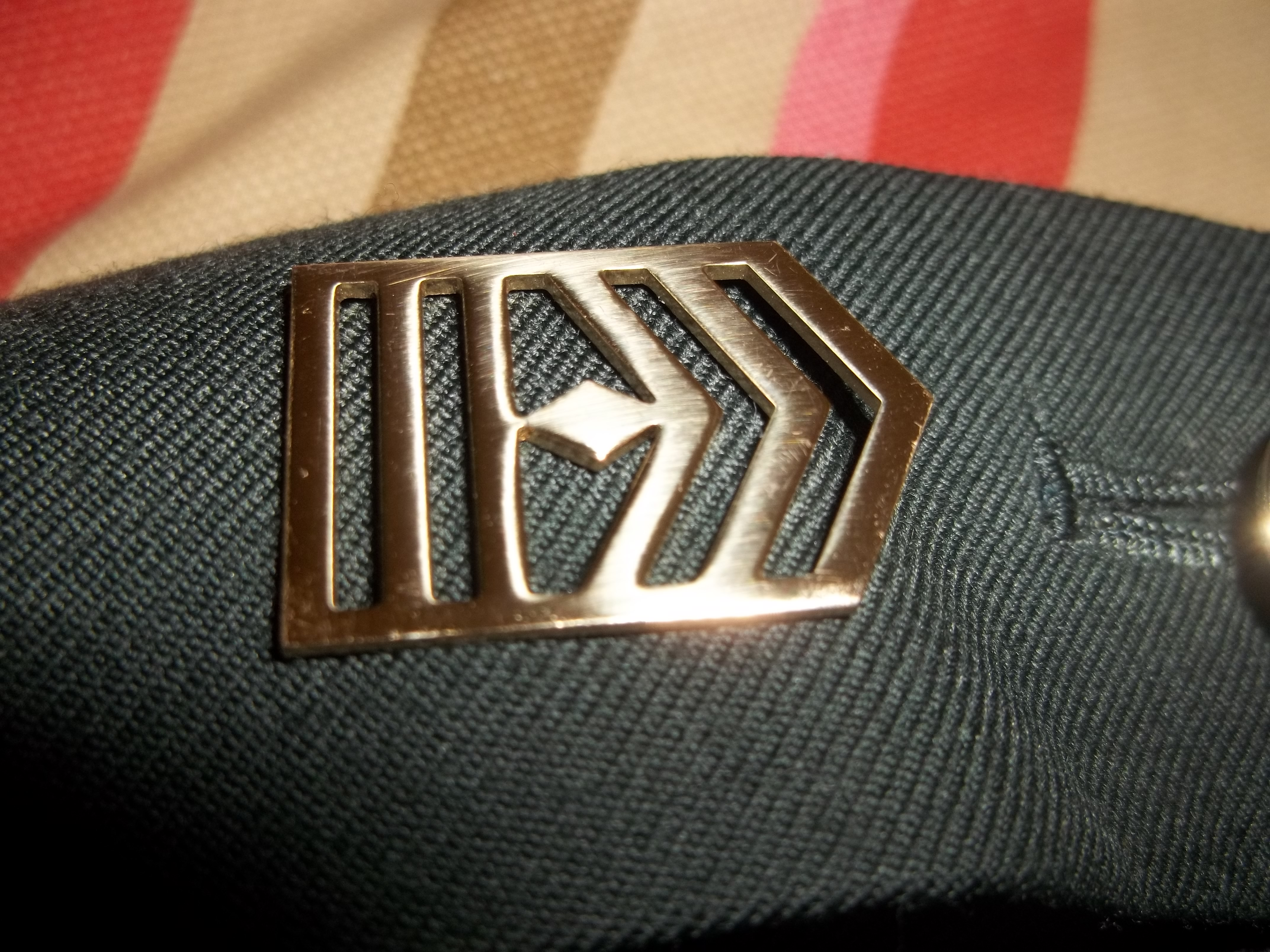
A metallic insignia depicting the rank of a first sergeant

A rank is a position in a hierarchy. It can be formally recognized—for example, cardinal, chief executive officer, general, professor—or unofficial.

== People ==
=== Formal ranks ===
- Academic rank
- Corporate title
- Diplomatic rank
- Hierarchy of the Catholic Church
- Imperial, royal and noble ranks
- Military rank
- Police rank

=== Unofficial ranks ===
- Social class
- Social position
- Social status

=== Either ===
- Seniority

== Mathematics ==
- Rank (differential topology)
- Rank (graph theory)
- Rank (linear algebra), the dimension of the vector space generated (or spanned) by a matrix's columns
- Rank (set theory)
- Rank (type theory)
- Rank of an abelian group, the cardinality of a maximal linearly independent subset
- Rank of an elliptic curve
- Rank of a free module
- Rank of a generalized eigenvector
- Rank of a greedoid, the maximal size of a feasible set
- Rank of a group, the smallest cardinality of a generating set for the group
- Rank of a Lie group – see Cartan subgroup
- Rank of a matroid, the maximal size of an independent set
- Rank of a partition, at least two definitions in number theory
- Rank of a tensor
- Rank of a vector bundle
- Rank statistics

== Other ==
- Taxonomic rank, in biology
- Rank (J programming language)

== See also ==
- Ranking
