= FL (programming language) =

- Paradigm: Function-level, functional
- Designed by: John Backus; John Williams; Edward Wimmers
- Developer: IBM Research
- First appeared: 1989; 37 years ago
- Typing discipline: Dynamic

Influenced by
- FP

FL (for Function Level) is a programming language created at IBM Research – Almaden, California by John Backus, John Williams, and Edward Wimmers in the 1980s and documented in a report from 1989. FL was designed as a successor of Backus's earlier FP language, providing specific support for what Backus termed function-level programming.

FL is a dynamically typed strict functional programming language with throw and catch exception semantics much as in ML. Each function has an implicit history argument which is used for doing things like strictly functional input/output (I/O), but is also used to link to C code. For optimizing, there exists a type system which is an extension of Hindley–Milner type system inference.

== PLaSM ==
PLaSM is a "geometry-oriented extension of a subset of the FL language" first described in 1992.
