= Von Neumann programming languages =

A von Neumann language in computing is a programming language that is a high-level abstract isomorphic copy of a von Neumann architecture. As of 2009, most current programming languages fit into this description, likely as a consequence of the extensive domination of the von Neumann computer architecture during the past 50 years.

The differences between Fortran, C, and even Java, although considerable, are ultimately constrained by all three being based on the programming style of the von Neumann computer. If, for example, Java objects were all executed in parallel with asynchronous message passing and attribute-based declarative addressing, then Java would not be in the group.

The isomorphism between von Neumann programming languages and architectures is in the following manner:

- program variables ↔ computer storage cells
- control statements ↔ computer test-and-jump instructions
- assignment statements ↔ fetching, storing instructions
- expressions ↔ memory reference and arithmetic instructions.

== Criticism ==
John Backus asserted that assignment statements in von Neumann languages split programming into two worlds. The first world consists of expressions, an orderly mathematical space with potentially useful algebraic properties: most computation takes place here. The second world consists of statements, a disorderly mathematical space with few useful mathematical properties (structured programming can be seen as a limited heuristic that does apply in this space, though).

Backus claimed that by 1978 there existed in computer science a vicious cycle where the long-standing emphasis on von Neumann languages has continued the primacy of the von Neumann computer architecture, and dependency on it has made non-von Neumann languages uneconomical and thus limited their further development: the lack of widely available and effective non-von Neumann languages has deprived computer designers of the motivation and the intellectual foundation needed to develop new computer architectures.

== Presence in modern systems ==
Many modern processors now contain multiple processing cores, and multi-threaded programming is usually the most efficient way to use more computational power in a single program. Some modern processors are highly optimized with techniques including out-of-order execution, but with complex logic to detect when this can be done without violating the von Neumann semantics of the logical programming model. Separate instruction and data caches are widely used, making the hardware a Modified Harvard architecture, but again with logic to detect cases where the optimization fails, to be able to execute self-modifying code.

Some specialized processors (including GPUs) are very wide multiple instruction, multiple data (MIMD) devices. General-purpose CPUs do commonly have multiple cores, but each one is fast enough that many programs are fast enough without parallelizing single tasks. (Threads are commonly used to deal with asynchronous inputs or outputs, especially in a GUI.) General-purpose CPUs are technically MIMD devices, but usually only hardware designed from the ground up for MIMD programming is referred to as MIMD.

Many widely used programming languages such as C, C++ and Java have ceased to be strictly von Neumann by adding support for parallel processing, in the form of threads. However, most of the categorically non-von Neumann languages are also functional languages and have not achieved widespread use.

== See also ==
- Homoiconicity
