= John Backus =

American computer scientist (1924–2007)

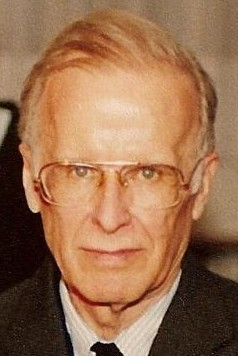
- Backus in 1989
- Born: John Warner Backus; December 3, 1924; Philadelphia, Pennsylvania, U.S.
- Died: March 17, 2007 (aged 82); Ashland, Oregon, U.S.
- Education: University of Virginia; University of Pittsburgh; Haverford College; Columbia University (BS, MS)
- Known for: Speedcoding; FORTRAN; ALGOL; Backus–Naur form Function-level programming
- Spouses: Marjorie Jamison (m. 1947–1966) Barbara Una (m. 1968; died 2004)
- Children: 2
- Awards: National Medal of Science (1975); Turing Award (1977); Charles Stark Draper Prize (1993)
- Scientific career
- Fields: Computer science
- Workplaces: IBM

John Warner Backus (December 3, 1924 – March 17, 2007) was an American computer scientist. He led the team that invented and implemented FORTRAN, the first widely used high-level programming language, and was the inventor of the Backus–Naur form (BNF), a widely used notation to define syntaxes of formal languages. He also contributed to the design of ALGOL, and later researched the function-level programming paradigm, presenting his findings in his influential 1977 Turing Award lecture "Can Programming Be Liberated from the von Neumann Style?"

The IEEE awarded Backus the W. W. McDowell Award in 1967 for the development of FORTRAN. He received the National Medal of Science in 1975 and the 1977 ACM Turing Award "for profound, influential, and lasting contributions to the design of practical high-level programming systems, notably through his work on FORTRAN, and for publication of formal procedures for the specification of programming languages".

John Backus retired in 1991. He died at his home in Ashland, Oregon on March 17, 2007.

== Early life ==
Backus was born in Philadelphia and grew up in nearby Wilmington, Delaware. He studied at The Hill School in Pottstown, Pennsylvania, but he was apparently not a diligent student. He entered college at the University of Virginia to study chemistry, but struggled with his classes there, and he was expelled after less than a year for poor attendance. He was subsequently conscripted into the U.S. Army during World War II, and eventually came to hold the rank of corporal, being put in command of an anti-aircraft battery stationed at Fort Stewart, Georgia.

After receiving high scores on a military aptitude test, the Army sent him to study engineering at the University of Pittsburgh. He later transferred to a pre-medical program at Haverford College. During an internship at a hospital, he was diagnosed with a cranial bone tumor, which was successfully removed, and a plate was installed in his head. He then moved to the Flower and Fifth Avenue Medical School for medical school, but found it uninteresting and dropped out after nine months. He soon underwent a second operation to replace the metal plate in his head with one of his own design, and received an honorable medical discharge from the U.S. Army in 1946.

== Fortran ==
After moving to New York City he trained initially as a radio technician and became interested in mathematics. He graduated from Columbia University with a bachelor's degree in 1949 and a master's degree in 1950, both in mathematics, and joined IBM in 1950. During his first three years, he worked on the Selective Sequence Electronic Calculator (SSEC); his first major project was to write a program to calculate positions of the Moon. In 1953, Backus developed the language Speedcoding, the first high-level language created for an IBM computer, to aid in software development for the IBM 701 computer.

Programming was very difficult at this time, and in 1954 Backus assembled a team to define and develop Fortran for the IBM 704 computer. Fortran was the first high-level programming language to be put to broad use. This widely used language made computers practical and accessible machines for scientists and others without requiring them to have deep knowledge of the machinery.

== Backus–Naur form ==
Backus served on the international committees that developed ALGOL 58 and the very influential ALGOL 60, which quickly became the de facto worldwide standard for publishing algorithms. Backus developed the Backus–Naur form (BNF), published in the UNESCO report on ALGOL 58. It was a formal notation able to describe any context-free programming language, and was important in the development of compilers. A few deviations from this approach were tried (notably in Lisp and APL), but by the 1970s, Backus–Naur context-free specifications for computer languages had become quite standard, following the development of automated compiler generators such as yacc.

This contribution helped Backus win the ACM Turing Award in 1977.

== Function-level programming ==
Backus later worked on a function-level programming language known as FP, which he described in his Turing Award lecture "Can Programming be Liberated from the von Neumann Style?". Sometimes viewed as Backus's apology for creating Fortran, this paper did less to garner interest in the FP language than to spark research into functional programming in general. When Backus publicized the function-level style of programming, his message was mostly misunderstood as being the same as traditional functional programming style languages.

FP was strongly inspired by Kenneth E. Iverson's APL, even using a non-standard character set. An FP interpreter was distributed with the 4.2BSD Unix operating system, but there were relatively few implementations of the language, most of which were used for educational purposes.

Backus spent the latter part of his career developing FL (from "Function Level"), a successor to FP. FL was an internal IBM research project, and development of the language stopped when the project was finished. Only a few papers documenting it remain, and the source code of the compiler described in them was not made public. FL was at odds with functional programming languages being developed in the 1980s, most of which were based on the lambda calculus and static typing systems instead of, as in APL, the concatenation of primitive operations. Many of the language's ideas have now been implemented in versions of the J programming language, Iverson's successor to APL.

== Awards and honors ==
- Named an IBM Fellow (1963)
- W. W. McDowell Award (1967)
- National Medal of Science (1975)
- Turing Award (1977)
- Fellow of the American Academy of Arts and Sciences (1985)
- Doctor honoris causa Université Henri-Poincaré (1989)
- Draper Prize (1993)
- Computer History Museum Fellow Award "for his development of FORTRAN, contributions to computer systems theory and software project management." (1997)
- Asteroid 6830 Johnbackus named in his honor (June 1, 2007) †

== See also ==
- List of pioneers in computer science
