= List of programming languages =

This is an index to notable programming languages, in current or historical use. Dialects of BASIC (which have their own page), esoteric programming languages, and markup languages are not included. A programming language does not need to be imperative or Turing-complete, but must be executable and so does not include markup languages such as HTML or XML, but does include domain-specific languages such as SQL and its dialects.

== A ==
- A.NET (A#/A sharp)
- A-0 System
- A+ (A plus)
- ABAP
- ABC
- ACC
- Accent (Rational Synergy)
- Action!
- ActionScript
- Actor
- Ada – ISO/IEC 8652
- Adenine (Haystack)
- AdvPL
- Agda
- Agilent VEE (Keysight VEE)
- Agora
- AIMMS
- Aldor
- Alef
- Algebraic Logic Functional programming language (ALF)
- ALGOL 58
- ALGOL 60
- ALGOL 68
- ALGOL W
- Alice ML
- Alma-0
- AmbientTalk
- Amiga E
- AMPL
- Analitik
- AngelScript
- Apache Pig latin
- Apex (Salesforce.com, Inc)
- APL
- App Inventor for Android's visual block language (MIT App Inventor)
- AppleScript
- APT
- Arc
- ArkTS
- ARexx
- Argus
- Assembly language (ASM)
- AssemblyScript
- ATS
- AutoHotkey
- AutoIt
- AutoLISP, Visual LISP
- Averest
- AWK
- Axum

== B ==
- B
- Babbage
- Ballerina
- Bash
- BASIC
- Batch file (Windows/MS-DOS)
- bc (basic calculator)
- BCPL
- BeanShell
- Bend
- BETA
- BLISS
- Blockly
- BlooP
- Boo
- Boomerang
- Bosque

== C ==
- C – ISO/IEC 9899
- C-- (C minus minus)
- C++ (C plus plus) – ISO/IEC 14882
- C*
- C# (C sharp) – ISO/IEC 23270
- C/AL
- Caché ObjectScript
- C Shell (csh)
- Calcpad
- Caml
- Carbon
- Catrobat
- Cayenne (Lennart Augustsson)
- Cecil
- CESIL (Computer Education in Schools Instruction Language)
- CEEMAC
- Céu
- Ceylon
- CFEngine
- Cg (High-Level Shader/Shading Language [HLSL])
- Ch
- Chapel (Cascade High Productivity Language)
- Charm
- CHICKEN
- CHILL
- CHIP-8
- ChucK
- Cilk (also Cilk++ and Cilk plus)
- Claire
- Clarion
- Clean
- Clipper
- CLIPS
- CLIST
- Clojure
- CLU
- CMS-2
- COBOL – ISO/IEC 1989
- CobolScript – COBOL Scripting language
- Cobra
- CoffeeScript
- ColdFusion
- COMAL
- COMIT
- Common Intermediate Language (CIL)
- Common Lisp (also known as CL)
- COMPASS
- Component Pascal
- COMTRAN
- Concurrent Pascal
- Constraint Handling Rules (CHR)
- Control Language
- Coq, renamed Rocq
- CORAL, Coral 66
- CorVision
- COWSEL
- CPL
- Cryptol
- Crystal
- Csound
- Cuneiform
- Curl
- Curry
- Cybil
- Cyclone
- Cypher Query Language
- Cython

== D ==
- D (also known as dlang)
- Dart
- Darwin
- DataFlex
- Datalog
- DATATRIEVE
- dBase
- dc
- DCL (DIGITAL Command Language)
- Delphi
- DIBOL
- DinkC
- Dog
- Draco
- DRAKON
- Dylan
- DYNAMO
- DAX (Data Analysis Expressions)

== E ==
- E
- Ease
- Easy PL/I
- EASYTRIEVE PLUS
- ECMAScript
- Edinburgh IMP
- EGL
- Eiffel
- ELAN
- Elixir
- Elm
- Emacs Lisp
- Emerald
- Epigram
- EPL (Easy Programming Language)
- Erlang
- es
- Escher
- ESPOL
- Esterel
- Etoys
- Euclid
- Euler
- Euphoria
- EusLisp Robot Programming Language
- CMS EXEC (EXEC)
- EXEC 2
- Executable UML
- Ezhil

== F ==
- F
- F# (F sharp)
- F*
- Factor
- Fantom
- FAUST
- FFP
- fish
- Fjölnir
- FL
- Flavors
- Flex
- Flix
- FlooP
- FLOW-MATIC (B0)
- FOCAL (Formulating On-Line Calculations in Algebraic Language/FOrmula CALculator)
- FOCUS
- FOIL
- FORMAC (FORMula MAnipulation Compiler)
- @Formula
- Forth
- Fortran – ISO/IEC 1539
- Fortress
- FoxBase/FoxPro
- FP
- Franz Lisp
- Futhark

== G ==
- Game Maker Language
- General Algebraic Modeling System (GAMS)
- GAP
- G-code
- GDScript (Godot)
- Geometric Description Language (GDL)
- GEORGE
- Gleam
- OpenGL Shading Language (GLSL)
- GNU E
- GNU Guile (GNU Ubiquitous Intelligent Language for Extensions)
- GNU Octave
- Go
- Go!
- Game Oriented Assembly Lisp (GOAL)
- Gödel
- Golo
- Good Old Mad (GOM)
- Google Apps Script
- Gosu
- GOTRAN (IBM 1620)
- General Purpose Simulation System (GPSS)
- GraphTalk (Computer Sciences Corporation)
- GRASS
- Grasshopper
- Groovy (by Apache)

== H ==
- Hack
- HAGGIS
- HAL/S
- Halide (programming language)
- Hamilton C shell
- Harbour
- Hartmann pipelines
- Haskell
- Haxe
- Hermes
- High Level Assembly (HLA)
- High Level Shader Language (HLSL)
- Hollywood
- HolyC (TempleOS)
- Hop
- Hope
- Hopscotch
- Hume
- HyperTalk
- Hy

== I ==
- IBM Basic assembly language and successors
- IBM Informix-4GL
- IBM RPG
- Icon
- IDL
- Idris
- Inform
- Instruction List
- Io
- ISLISP

== J ==
- J
- J# (J sharp)
- J++ (J plus plus)
- JADE
- JAL
- Janus (concurrent constraint programming language)
- Janus (time-reversible computing programming language)
- JASS
- Java
- JavaFX Script
- JavaScript
- JCL
- JEAN
- Jess
- Join Java
- JOSS
- Joule
- JOVIAL
- Joy
- jq
- JScript
- JScript .NET
- Julia
- Jython

== K ==
- K
- Kaleidoscope
- Karel
- KEE
- Kent Recursive Calculator (KRC)
- KiXtart
- Klerer-May System
- Knowledge Interchange Format (KIF)
- Kodu
- Kojo
- Kotlin
- KRL
- KRL (KUKA Robot Language)
- KRYPTON
- KornShell (ksh)
- Kv (Kivy)

== L ==
- LabVIEW
- Ladder
- Language H
- LANSA
- Lasso
- LC-3
- Lean
- Legoscript
- LIL
- LilyPond
- Limbo
- LINC
- Lingo
- LINQ
- LIS
- LISA
- Lisp – ISO/IEC 13816
- Lithe
- Little b
- LiveCode
- LiveScript
- LLL
- Logo
- Logtalk
- LotusScript
- LPC
- LSE
- LSL
- Lua
- Luau
- Lucid
- Lustre
- LYaPAS
- Lynx

== M ==
- M Formula language
- M4
- Machine code
- MAD (Michigan Algorithm Decoder)
- MAD/I
- Magik
- Magma
- Maple
- MAPPER (now part of BIS)
- MARK-IV (now VISION:BUILDER)
- Mary
- MASM Microsoft Assembly x86
- MATLAB
- MATH-MATIC
- Maude system
- Max (Max Msp – Graphical Programming Environment)
- Maxima (see also Macsyma)
- MaxScript internal language 3D Studio Max
- Maya (MEL)
- MDL
- Mercury
- Mesa
- MHEG-5 (Interactive TV programming language)
- Microcode
- Microsoft Power Fx
- MIIS
- MIMIC
- Mirah
- Miranda
- MIVA Script
- ML
- Model 204
- Modelica
- Modula
- Modula-2
- Modula-3
- Mohol
- Mojo
- MOO
- Mortran
- Mouse
- MPD
- MSL
- MUMPS
- MuPAD
- Mystic Programming Language (MPL)

== N ==
- Napier88
- NASM
- Neko
- NELIAC
- Nemerle
- NESL
- Net.Data
- NetLogo
- NetRexx
- NewLISP
- NEWP
- Newspeak
- NewtonScript
- Nial
- Nim
- Nix (system configuring language)
- Nord Programming Language (NPL)
- Not eXactly C (NXC)
- Not Quite C (NQC)
- Nu
- Nullsoft Scriptable Install System (NSIS)
- NWScript
- NXT-G

== O ==
- o:XML
- Oak
- Oberon
- OBJ2
- Object Lisp
- ObjectLOGO
- Object REXX
- Object Pascal
- Objective-C
- Obliq
- OCaml
- occam
- occam-π
- OmniMark
- Opa
- Opal
- Open Programming Language (OPL)
- OpenCL
- OpenEdge Advanced Business Language (ABL)
- OpenQASM
- OPS5
- OptimJ
- Orc
- ORCA/Modula-2
- Oriel
- Orwell
- Oxygene
- Oz

== P ==
- P
- P4
- P′′
- ParaSail
- PARI/GP
- Pascal – ISO 7185
- Pascal Script
- PCASTL
- PCF
- PDL
- PEARL
- PeopleCode
- Perl
- Pharo
- PHP
- Pico
- Picolisp
- Pict
- Pike
- PILOT
- Pipelines
- Pizza
- PL-11
- PL/0
- PL/B
- PL/C
- PL/I – ISO 6160
- PL/M
- PL/P
- PL/S
- PL/SQL
- PL360
- PLANC
- Plankalkül
- Planner
- PLEX
- PLEXIL
- Plus
- Pony
- POP-11
- POP-2
- PostScript
- PortablE
- POV-Ray SDL
- PowerBuilder – 4GL GUI application generator from Sybase
- Powerhouse
- PowerShell
- Polymorphic Programming Language (PPL)
- Processing, Processing.js
- Prograph
- Project Verona
- Prolog
- PROMAL
- Promela
- PROSE modeling language
- PROTEL
- Pro*C
- Pure
- Pure Data
- PureScript
- Python

== Q ==
- Q (programming language from Kx Systems)
- Q#
- Qalb
- .QL
- QPL
- QtScript
- QuakeC
- Quantum Computation Language

== R ==
- R
- R++
- Racket
- Raku
- RAPID
- Rapira
- Ratfiv
- Ratfor
- rc
- Reason
- REBOL
- Red
- Redcode
- REFAL
- ReScript
- REXX
- Rocq (former name: Coq)
- RPG
- RPL
- RSL
- RTL/2
- Ruby
- Rust

== S ==
- S
- S-Lang
- S-PLUS
- S2
- S3
- SA-C
- SabreTalk
- SAIL
- SAKO
- SAS
- SASL
- Sather
- Sawzall
- SBL
- Scala
- Scheme
- Scilab
- Scratch
- ScratchJr
- Script.NET
- Sed
- Seed7
- Self
- SenseTalk
- SequenceL
- Serpent
- SETL
- Short Code
- SIGNAL
- SiMPLE
- SIMPOL
- SIMSCRIPT
- Simula
- Simulink
- SISAL
- SKILL
- SLIP
- SMALL
- Smalltalk
- SML
- Snap!
- SNOBOL (SPITBOL)
- Snowball
- SOL
- Solidity
- SOPHAEROS
- Source
- SPARK
- Speakeasy
- Speedcode
- SPIN
- SP/k
- SPL
- SPS
- SQL
- SQR
- Squeak
- Squirrel
- SR
- S/SL
- Starlogo
- Stata
- Stateflow
- Strand
- Strongtalk
- Structured Text
- Subtext
- SuperCollider
- Superplan
- SuperTalk
- Swift (Apple programming language)
- Swift (parallel scripting language)
- SYCL
- SYMPL

== T ==
- T
- TACL
- Tcl (aka Tcl/Tk)
- Tea
- TELCOMP
- Tensilica Instruction Extension (TIE)
- TeX
- Text Adventure Development System (TADS)
- Text Editor and Corrector (TECO)
- Text Processing Utility (TPU)
- TMG (TransMoGrifier), compiler-compiler
- Tom
- Topspeed (Clarion)
- TRAC
- Transact-SQL (T-SQL)
- Transaction Application Language (TAL)
- Transcript (LiveCode)
- TTCN (Tree and Tabular Combined Notation)
- TTM
- Turing
- TUTOR (PLATO Author Language)
- TXL
- TypeScript
- Tynker

== U ==
- Ubercode
- UCSD Pascal
- Umple
- Unicon
- Uniface
- UNITY
- UnrealScript

== V ==
- V (also known as vlang)
- Vala
- Verse
- Vim script
- Viper (Ethereum/Ether (ETH))
- Visual DataFlex
- Visual DialogScript
- Visual FoxPro
- Visual J++ (Visual J plus plus)
- Visual LISP
- Visual Objects
- Visual Prolog

== W ==
- WATFIV, WATFOR (WATerloo FORtran IV)
- WebAssembly
- WebGPU Shading Language (WGSL)
- Whiley
- Wolfram Language
- Wyvern

== X ==
- X++ (X plus plus/Microsoft Dynamics AX)
- X10
- XBL
- XC (targets XMOS architecture)
- XL
- Xod
- Xojo
- XOTcl
- XPL
- XPL0
- XQuery
- XSB
- XSLT
- Xtend

== Y ==
- Yorick
- YQL

== Z ==
- Z++
- Z shell
- Zebra, ZPL, ZPL2
- ZetaLisp
- Zig
- Zonnon
- ZOPL
- ZPL

== See also ==
- Category:Programming languages
- Comparison of programming languages
- History of programming languages
- List of BASIC dialects
- List of integrated development environments
- List of markup languages
- List of open-source programming languages
- List of programming languages by type
- List of programming languages for artificial intelligence
- List of stylesheet languages
- Lists of programming languages
- List of hello world programs at Wikibooks
