= List of JVM languages =

List of programming software

This list of JVM languages comprises notable computer programming languages that are used to produce computer software that runs on the Java virtual machine (JVM). A Java program interprets some of these languages, and others are compiled to JVM bytecode and just-in-time (JIT) compiled during execution, as with regular Java programs, to improve performance.

The JVM was initially designed to support only the Java language. However, over time, additional languages were adapted or designed to run on the Java platform.

== JVM languages ==
=== High-profile languages ===
As of February 2026, according to the TIOBE index of the top 100 programming languages, and PyPL, the top JVM languages are:

- Java (#4, at one point at #1; #3 at PyPL, after "C/C++" as 2nd), a statically-typed object-oriented language
- Kotlin (#20; #18, and at one point at #13, at PyPL), a statically-typed language from JetBrains, the developers of IntelliJ IDEA, and Google's preferred language for Android
- Scala (#39, at one point at #20; #22 at PyPL), a statically-typed object-oriented and functional programming language
- Groovy (no longer in top 50, is one of 51–100, at one point at #15; #30 at PyPL), a dynamic programming language (also with static typing) and scripting language
- Clojure (no longer in top 50, is one of 51–100, at one point at #47), a dynamic, and functional dialect of the Lisp programming language (ClojureScript doesn't make TIOBE's index separately, its stats are included under Clojure, and it's an implementation targeting the web with JavaScript, not the JVM.)

Python is TIOBE's top language; Jython, its JVM implementation, doesn't make the list (of 100 languages) under that name (is syntax compatible with Python 2.7, now an outdated Python version). JavaScript (6th), PHP, R, and others also make the top 20 and have JVM implementations; Ruby is ranked 25th, while JRuby, its JVM implementation, is not listed separately.

=== JVM implementations of existing languages ===
Language	JVM implementations
Go	jgo
Arden syntax	Arden2ByteCode
COBOL	NTT Data Enterprise COBOL Micro Focus Visual COBOL; Heirloom Elastic COBOL; Veryant isCOBOL Evolve
ColdFusion Markup Language (CFML)	Adobe ColdFusion; Lucee; Open BlueDragon
Common Lisp	Armed Bear Common Lisp
Cypher	Neo4j
Haskell	Eta (programming language)
JavaScript	Rhino; Nashorn Graal.js
LLVM Bitcode	Sulong
Mercury	Mercury (Java grade)
OCaml	OCaml-Java
Component Pascal	Gardens Point Component Pascal
Pascal	MIDletPascal; Oxygene
Raku	Rakudo
PHP	Quercus; JPHP
Prolog	JIProlog; TuProlog
Python	Jython ZipPy; Graal.Python
R	Renjin FastR
Rexx	NetRexx
Ruby	JRuby; TruffleRuby
Scheme	Bigloo; Kawa; SISC; JScheme
Simula	Open Source Simula
Smalltalk	Redline
Standard ML	MLj
Tcl	Jacl
Visual Basic	Jabaco (Note: is a freeware IDE in beta-testing since 2009, with a partly open source Jabaco framework runtime. Jabaco compiles VB 6 syntax source to JVM bytecode.)

=== New languages with JVM implementations ===
- Ateji PX, an extension of Java for easy parallel programming on multicore, GPU, Grid, and Cloud
- Ballerina, a language for cloud applications with structural typing; network client objects, services, resource functions, and listeners; parallel concurrency with workers; image building; and configuration management.
- BeanShell, a scripting language which syntax is close to Java
- BoxLang, A modern, dynamically and loosely typed scripting language for multiple runtimes. For the Java virtual machine (JVM) giving object-oriented (OO), functional programming (FP) constructs, and dynamic metadata programming (MP)
- Event Processing Language (EPL), a domain-specific, data manipulation language for analyzing and detecting patterns in timed event streams, which extends SQL-92 with event-oriented features. It is implemented by Esper: up to version 6, EPL was mostly an interpreted language implemented by a Java library; since version 7, it is compiled to JVM bytecode.
- Concurnas, an open source JVM language designed for building reliable, scalable, high-performance concurrent, distributed, and parallel systems.
- Ceylon, a Java competitor from Red Hat
- ColdFusion Markup Language (CFML), a scripting language for web development that runs on the JVM, the .NET Framework, and Google App Engine.
- Quark Framework (CAL), a Haskell-inspired functional language
- E-on-Java, an object-oriented language for secure distributed computing
- Eta, pure, lazy, strongly typed functional language in the spirit of Haskell
- Fantom, a language built from the base to be portable across the JVM, .NET Common Language Runtime (CLR), and JavaScript
- Flix, a functional, imperative, and logic language with first-class Datalog constraints and a polymorphic effect system.
- Flow Java
- Fortress, a language designed by Sun as a successor to Fortran, mainly for parallel scientific computing. Oracle took over product development after its acquisition of Sun. Oracle then stopped development in 2012, according to Dr. Dobb's.
- Frege, a non-strict, pure functional language in the spirit of Haskell
- Golo, a simple, dynamic, weakly typed language for the JVM developed at the Institut national des sciences appliquées de Lyon, France, now an incubating project at the Eclipse Software Foundation.
- Gosu, a precursor to Kotlin with an extensible type system
- Haxe, a cross-platform statically typed language that targets Java and the JVM.
- Ioke, a prototype-based language somewhat reminiscent of Io, with similarities to Ruby, Lisp, and Smalltalk
- Jactl, embeddable scripting language.
- Jelly
- Join Java, a language that extends Java with join-calculus semantics.
- Joy
- Manifold is not a separate language. It integrates with the Java compiler via the official javac plugin API and can be added as a dependency in existing Java projects. It brings static metaprogramming, type system extensions, properties, extension methods, operator overloading, named and optional arguments, and more.
- Mirah, a customizable language featuring type inference and a highly Ruby-inspired syntax
- NetLogo, a multi-agent language
- Noop, a language built with testability as a primary focus
- Pizza, a superset of Java with function pointers and algebraic data types
- Pnuts
- Processing, a visualization and animation language and framework based on Java with Java-like syntax
- Prompto, a language "designed to create business applications in the cloud". It is part of the namesake platform to design business applications directly in the cloud. The Prompto language includes three "dialects": Engly, Monty, and Objy. Engly "mimics English as much as possible", Monty "tries to follow as much as possible the syntax of the Python 3 language", and Objy "tries to follow as much as possible the syntax of OOP languages such as C++, Java or C#". All three dialects seamlessly translate to one another.
- RascalMPL, a source and target language independent (parameterized) meta language
- Whiley
- X10, a language designed by IBM, featuring constrained types and a focus on concurrency and distribution
- Xtend, an object-oriented, functional, and imperative programming language built by the Eclipse foundation, featuring tight Java interoperability, with a focus on extension methods and lambdas, and rich tooling
- Yeti, an ML-style functional language
- Yirgacheffe, a language that aims to simplify and extend the object-oriented paradigm.
- Yoix, general-purpose, non-object-oriented, interpreted dynamic language
- ZoomBA, a dynamic, declarative, interpreted language.

==== Comparison of these languages ====
Language	First release	Stable release	Last release
Ballerina	2018	2019	2024
BeanShell	1999	2013	2022
Eclipse Ceylon	2011	2017	2017
CFML	1995	2018	2025
E	1997		2016
Fantom	2011	2017	2024
Fortress	2006	2011	2011
Frege	2012		2018
Manifold	2019	2019	2023
Mirah	2016		2016
Xtend	2011	2021	2024

== See also ==
- Da Vinci Machine
- Java virtual machine § JVM languages
- List of CLI languages, following the CLI specification, Microsoft's response to JVM
- List of open-source programming languages
