= Alphard (disambiguation) =

Alphard is the proper name of the star α Hydrae.

Alphard may also refer to:

- Toyota Alphard, a Japanese minivan
- Alphard (programming language), a Pascal-like computer language

== See also ==
- Alpharad
- Alphand (disambiguation)
