= Esterel (disambiguation) =

Esterel is a programming language for complex reactive systems.

Esterel or Estérel may also refer to:

- Esterel Technologies, a software company
- Estérel, Quebec, a city in Canada
- Massif de l'Esterel, a mountain range in France
- MV Esterel, a British ship
