= RTL2 =

RTL2 may refer to:

- RTL Zwei, a German general-interest television channel
- RTL 2 (Croatia), a Croatian commercial broadcaster with national availability
- RTL2 (France), a French private radio station, based in Paris
- RTL Kettő, a Hungarian commercial broadcaster
- RTL/2, a real-time programming language based on Algol 68
- RTL Zwee, a Luxembourg television channel for young adults
