= TXL =

TXL may refer to:

- TXL (programming language)
- Berlin Tegel Airport, defunct German airport (by IATA code)
- Fictional computer in the Today's Special animated series
