= Euclid (programming language) =

- Paradigm: multi-paradigm: structured, imperative, functional
- Designed by: Butler Lampson, James G. Mitchell, Jim Horning, Ralph L. London, Gerald J. Popek
- Developer: Ric Holt and James Cordy
- First appeared: 1970s
- Typing discipline: strong, static

Influenced by
- Pascal, Mesa, Alphard, CLU, Gypsy, BCPL, Modula, LIS, SUE

Influenced
- Concurrent Euclid, Turing

Euclid is an imperative programming language for writing verifiable programs. It was designed in the mid-1970s by Butler Lampson and James G. Mitchell at the Xerox PARC lab in collaboration with Jim Horning at the University of Toronto, Ralph L. London at USC ISI, and Gerald J. Popek at UCLA. The implementation was led by Ric Holt at the University of Toronto, and James Cordy was the principal programmer for the first implementation of the compiler. It was originally designed for the Motorola 6809 microprocessor. It was considered innovative for the time; the compiler development team had a $2 million budget over 2 years and was commissioned by the Defense Advanced Research Projects Agency of the U.S. Department of Defense and the Canadian Department of National Defence. It was used for a few years at I. P. Sharp Associates, MITRE Corporation, SRI International and various other international institutes for research in systems programming and secure software systems.

Euclid is descended from Pascal, Mesa, Alphard, CLU, Gypsy, BCPL, Modula, LIS, and SUE. Functions in Euclid are closed scopes, may not have side effects, and must explicitly declare imports. Euclid also disallows gotos, floating-point numbers, global assignments, nested functions and aliases, and none of the actual parameters to a function can refer to the same memory cell (which Euclid calls a "variable"). Euclid implements modules as types. Descendants of Euclid include the Concurrent Euclid programming language and the Turing programming language.
