= Esterel Technologies =

French computer software company

- Type: Public
- Industry: Computer software
- Founded: Elancourt, France (1999)
- Headquarters: France, United States
- Key people: Eric Bantegnie, President and CEO
- Products: Scade Suite; Scade Display
- Number of employees: +100 (2019)
- Parent: Ansys
- Website: www.esterel-technologies.com

Esterel Technologies is a supplier of model-based design, validation, and code generation tools for safety-critical software and hardware applications. Esterel's tools create formal specifications that produce control designs code in software and/or hardware.

Esterel Technologies, a wholly owned subsidiary of Ansys, Inc., has offices in Élancourt, France, and Mountain View, California. Esterel also has direct sales offices in Ottobrunn, Germany, Bracknell, United Kingdom, and Shanghai, P.R. China. Distributors in Japan, China, South Korea, Israel, and India complement the Esterel direct sales offices.

== Products ==
The Esterel Technologies' SCADE Product Family includes: SCADE System, SCADE Suite, SCADE Display, and SCADE LifeCycle. SCADE Suite was acquired from Telelogic in 2001.

In September 2006, Esterel Technologies acquired the IMAGE product from Thales and Diehl Aerospace. It is now proposed as SCADE Display, a display framework targeted for Real-time applications, for prototyping, display design, simulation, verification and validation, DO-178B certified code generation (up to level A), and integration with other applications.

In February 2007, Esterel Technologies announced a partnership with Wind River Systems to integrate SCADE in VxWorks 653 Real Time Operating System.

== History ==
Created in 2000, Esterel Technologies is a spin-off from the French company Simulog (itself bought by Astek in 2003). Simulog was itself a spin-off from INRIA, and many of the initial founders came from the INRIA laboratory. These include Gerard Berry, father of the Esterel language, which gave its name to the company. Its first product, Esterel Studio, was meant to bring synchronous programming language benefits to the industry (initially telecommunications and then EDA Electronic design automation). In 2003, a Lustre-based (one of the other synchronous programming language) tool-set named SCADE (Safety Critical Application Development Environment) was bought by Esterel Technologies, and the two academics communities behind these languages proposed a way to merge them. The result has been productized as SCADE Suite 6 and its subsequent versions.

In 2006, the tool developed by THALES to design the A380 cockpit, named IMAGE, was transferred to Esterel Technologies, and re-branded SCADE Display.

Later in 2009, Esterel Studio was acquired by Synfora.

Finally, in 2012, it was announced that ANSYS had signed a definitive agreement to purchase Esterel for approximately €42 million.
