= Gérard Berry =

French computer scientist

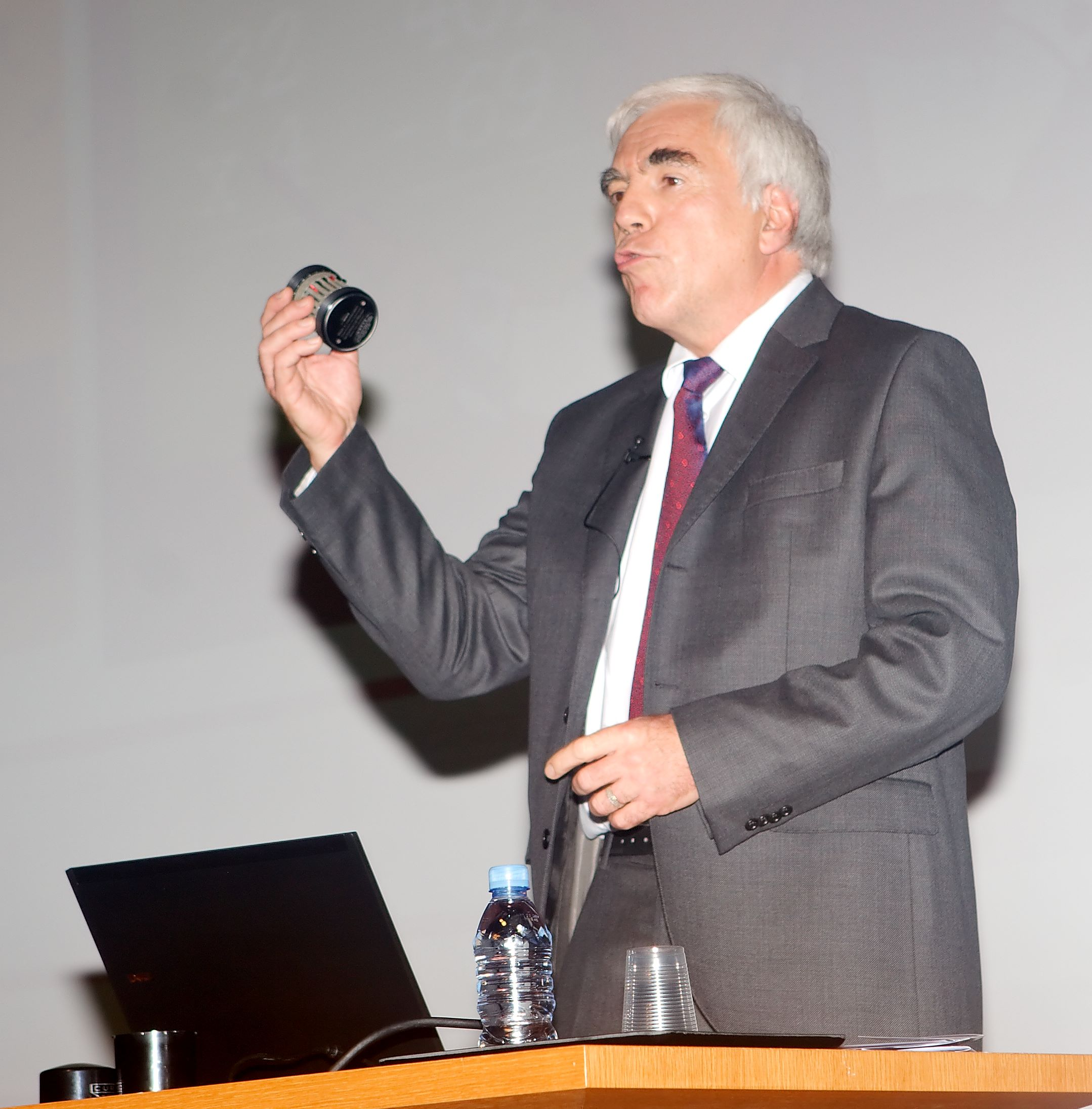
- Gérard Berry in 2008
- Born: 25 December 1948 (age 77)
- Education: École Polytechnique
- Scientific career
- Fields: Computer science
- Workplaces: Collège de France; Corps des mines

Gérard Philippe Berry (born 25 December 1948) is a French computer scientist, member of the French Academy of Sciences, French Academy of Technologies, and Academia Europaea. He was the Chief Scientist Officer of Esterel Technologies from 2000 to 2009. He held the 2007-2008 yearly Liliane Bettencourt chair of Technological Innovation at the Collège de France. He was Director of Research at INRIA Sophia-Antipolis and held the 2009-2010 yearly Informatics and Digital Sciences chair at the Collège de France. Berry's work, which spans over more than 30 years, brought important contributions to three main fields:

- lambda calculus and functional programming
- parallel and real-time programming languages
- design automation for synchronous digital circuits

Berry is known for the Esterel programming language.

== Bibliography ==
(in French)

- Gérard Berry, L'Hyperpuissance de l'informatique : algorithmes, données, machines, réseaux, Odile Jacob, 2017
- Gérard Berry, L'Informatique du temps et des événements, Fayard, Paris, 2013.
- Gérard Berry, Penser, modéliser et maîtriser le calcul informatique, Fayard, Paris, 2008
- Gérard Berry, Pourquoi et comment le monde devient numérique ?, Fayard, Paris, 2008.
