= John Barnes (computer scientist) =

British computer scientist

- Born: John Gilbert Presslie Barnes; United Kingdom
- Citizenship: United Kingdom
- Education: University of Cambridge
- Known for: Programming languages: RTL/2 ALGOL; Ada, Rendezvous mechanism
- Scientific career
- Fields: Computer science
- Institutions: Imperial Chemical Industries; Wolfson College, Oxford

John Gilbert Presslie Barnes is a British computer scientist best known for his role in developing and publicising the programming language Ada. He is the primary inventor of and protagonist for the Ada Rendezvous mechanism.

Barnes studied mathematics at University of Cambridge and later worked at Imperial Chemical Industries (ICI). He was an industrial fellow at Wolfson College, Oxford in the very late 1970s or early 1980s, most likely at the suggestion of Professor Tony Hoare.

Before working on the Ada design team, while at ICI, he designed and implemented a dialect of the language ALGOL, named Real-Time Language 2 (RTL/2) for real-time computing.

Barnes was awarded an honorary PhD from the University of York in 2006.

== Publications ==
- Barnes, J.G.P. (October 1976). RTL/ 2: Design and Philosophy. London: Heydon. ISBN 978-0855012243.
- Barnes, John; Brosgol, Ben (January 1995). Ada 95 Rationale: The Language, the Standard Libraries. Berlin; New York: Springer. ISBN 3-540-63143-7.
- Barnes, John (10 June 1998). Programming in Ada 95 (2nd ed.). Addison-Wesley. ISBN 0-201-34293-6.
- Barnes, John (15 June 1997). High Integrity Ada: The SPARK Approach. Addison-Wesley. ISBN 0-201-17517-7. Archived from the original on 5 April 2005.
- Barnes, John (25 April 2003). High Integrity Software: The SPARK Approach to Safety and Security. Addison-Wesley. ISBN 0-321-13616-0. Archived from the original on 27 December 2005.
- Barnes, John (30 June 2006). Programming in Ada 2005. Addison Wesley. ISBN 0-321-34078-7.
- Barnes, John (11 August 2014). Programming in Ada 2012. Cambridge University Press. ISBN 978-1107424814.
- Barnes, John (19 May 2022). Programming in Ada 2012 with a Preview of Ada 2022. Cambridge University Press. ISBN 978-1009181341.
