= Alphand =

Alphand may refer to:

- Hervé Alphand (1907-1994), French diplomat
- Jean-Charles Adolphe Alphand (1817-1891), engineer of the Second Empire of France
- Luc Alphand (b. 1965), French skier and driver
