= Wyvern (programming language) =

Wyvern is a computer programming language created by Jonathan Aldrich and Alex Potanin for the development of web and mobile applications with security and assurance being number one priority. Wyvern supports object capabilities, it is structurally typed, and aims to make secure way of programming easier than insecure. One of the early available features that make Wyvern special is a way to safely use multiple programming languages within the same program so programmers can use the language most appropriate for each function while at the same time increasing the program's security.

It is currently in a prototype stage and distributed under a GPLv2 license.

== Hello World ==
A 'Hello World' program in Wyvern looks as follows:

require stdout

stdout.print("Hello World")
