= List of style sheet languages =

The following is a list of style sheet languages.

== Standard ==
- Cascading Style Sheets (CSS)
- Document Style Semantics and Specification Language (DSSSL)
- Extensible Stylesheet Language (XSL)

== Non-standard ==
- JavaScript Style Sheets (JSSS)
- Formatting Output Specification Instance (FOSI)
- Syntactically Awesome Style Sheets (Sass)
- Less (Less)
- Stylus
- SMIL Timesheets
