= Mirah (programming language) =

- Paradigms: Object-oriented, imperative
- Designed by: Charles Oliver Nutter
- Stable release: 0.2.1 / September 26, 2016; 8 years ago
- Typing discipline: static, with dynamic features, strong, inferred
- Platform: Java virtual machine
- OS: Cross-platform
- License: Apache License 2.0
- Website: https://mirah.org/

Influenced by
- Ruby, Java, Boo

Mirah (formerly Duby) has been a programming language based on Ruby language syntax, local type inference, hybrid static–dynamic type system, and a pluggable compiler toolchain. Mirah was created by Charles Oliver Nutter to be "a 'Ruby-like' language, probably a subset of Ruby syntax, that [could] compile to solid, fast, idiomatic JVM bytecode." The word mirah refers to the gemstone ruby in the Javanese language, a play on the concept of Ruby in Java.

== History ==
To foster more participation in the JRuby project from Ruby community members, Nutter began to explore the possibility of presenting Ruby syntax, but with a static type model and direct-to-native compiling. In this context, "native" meant mainly the Java virtual machine (JVM), but Mirah has been designed around the possibility of having alternative backends for other object-oriented runtimes like the Common Language Runtime (CLR) of the .NET Framework. The language needed to look and feel like Ruby, and to introduce no new library dependencies into JRuby (which precludes most other JVM languages) and to suffer no performance penalty (which precludes writing in Ruby).

Early versions of Mirah (then Duby) focused mostly on mathematical performance, where dynamic programming languages often pay the highest cost. Since then it has evolved into a full JVM language, with several users and real-world applications using it for core components.

== Design ==
Mirah is mostly a pluggable compiler toolchain. The main elements of the chain are:

1. A parser, based on JRuby's parser, that emits a Ruby abstract syntax tree (AST)
2. A transformer that converts the Ruby AST into a Mirah AST
3. A type inferrer that decorates the Mirah AST with appropriate typing information for the target backend
4. A backend code generator

Of these phases, only the last two need specific knowledge of the eventual target platform. This makes Mirah suitable for many backends, and also makes it possible to write language plug-ins for Mirah's transformation phase that will apply to all supported backends equally.

For simple pieces of code and the JVM bytecode backend, the Mirah compiler emits nearly the same instructions as standard javac compilers.

=== No runtime library ===
Because Mirah is just a compiler, it ships no standard library. The intent is that Mirah users will choose what libraries they want to use, perhaps write plugins for the Mirah compiler to support them, and the compiler will do the rest. This is an explicit design goal, avoid introducing a requirement on any new external library. The standard library for Mirah, then, is whatever the standard library for the current backend is, and emphasis is placed on writing compiler plugins rather than libraries to extend and enhance the language.

=== Type system ===
Mirah does not impose a specific type system on users, instead relying on whatever the target backend provides. On the JVM, the type system is largely Java's type system, and type declarations refer to JVM classes, primitives, and interfaces.

Mirah is primarily a statically-typed language, but support is in development to allow dynamic typing also. The mechanism is similar to that provided in C# 4, with a special dynamic type indicating all dispatches against that variable's value should be done dynamically. Dynamic type support is currently planned only for Java 7 and higher, using the new invokedynamic bytecode.

== Syntax ==
The syntax of Mirah is largely the same as the syntax of Ruby, but with a few modifications to support static typing:

- Method parameters usually need to have their types declared:
  def foo(a:String, b:int)
- Because several transformations occur in the Mirah compiler toolchain, some strings that are valid identifiers in Ruby are treated as keywords in Mirah, such as the word interface used to specify a JVM-style interface.

Outside of these differences, Mirah code generally looks like Ruby code:

def fib(a:int)
  if a < 2
    a
  else
    fib(a - 1) + fib(a - 2)
  end
end

== Status ==
As of 2012, Mirah is under development, but some developers are using Mirah for production applications of limited scope.

== Frameworks ==
=== Dubious ===
Dubious is a project for running Mirah on Google App Engine. It provides a way to build apps in Mirah, with conventions familiar to developers using Ruby on Rails and Sinatra. Since everything is compiled ahead-of-time, Mirah applications have none of the initializing costs associated with JRuby. Dubious supports ERuby (ERb) and has a simple datastore adapter that uses a syntax similar to Datamapper.

== See also ==
- List of JVM languages
