= Golo (programming language) =

- Developer: INSA Lyon
- First appeared: 2012; 14 years ago
- Stable release: 3.4.0 / October 20, 2021; 4 years ago
- Typing discipline: Dynamic, weak
- Platform: Java virtual machine
- OS: Cross-platform
- License: Eclipse Public 2.0
- Website: golo-lang.org

Golo is computer software, a programming language for the Java virtual machine (JVM). It is simple, with dynamic, weak typing. It was created in 2012 as part of the research activities of the DynaMid group of the Centre of Innovation in Telecommunications and Integration of service (CITI) Laboratory at Institut national des sciences appliquées de Lyon (INSA). It is distributed as free and open-source software under the Eclipse Public License 2.0.

== History ==
It has been built as a showcase on how to build a language runtime with invokedynamic. Golo is largely interoperable with the programming language Java and other JVM languages (e.g., numeric types are boxing classes from java.lang, and collection literals leverage java.util classes), that runs on the JVM.

In June 2015, Golo became an official Eclipse Foundation project. The project was terminated in September 2022.

== Technical details ==
The language features have been initially designed around the abilities of invokedynamic – JSR 292 that appeared in Java SE 7. Golo uses ahead-of-time compilation of bytecode. While the bytecode remains stable over a program execution, the invokedynamic-based reconfigurable call sites support the adaptive dispatch mechanisms put in place for helping the HotSpot just-in-time compiler (JIT) to extract reasonable performance.

== Publications ==
- Baptiste Maingret, Frédéric Le Mouël, Julien Ponge, Nicolas Stouls, Jian Cia and Yannick Loiseau. Towards a Decoupled Context-Oriented Programming Language for the Internet of Things. To appear in the 7th International Workshop on Context-Oriented Programming hosted at ECOOP 2015. Prague, Czech Republic. July 2015.
- Julien Ponge, Frédéric Le Mouël, Nicolas Stouls, Yannick Loiseau. Opportunities for a Truffle-based Golo Interpreter. Technical report arXiv:1505.06003 (cs.PL) and HAL-INRIA deposit
- Julien Ponge, Frédéric Le Mouël and Nicolas Stouls. Golo, a Dynamic, Light and Efficient Language for Post-Invokedynamic JVM. In Procs. of PPPJ'13. Stuttgart, Germany. September 2013. DOI link. HAL-INRIA deposit. Slides.

== See also ==
- List of JVM languages
