= O:XML =

o:XML is an open source, dynamically typed, general-purpose object-oriented programming language based on XML-syntax. It has threads, exception handling, regular expressions and namespaces. Additionally o:XML has an expression language very similar to XPath that allows functions to be invoked on nodes and node sets.
