= Opal (programming language) =

Functional programming language

OPAL (OPtimized Applicative Language) is a functional programming language first developed at Technische Universität Berlin.

There is a later framework for static code analysis also called Opal.

== Example program ==
This is an example OPAL program, which calculates the GCD recursively.

Signature file (declaration)

   SIGNATURE GCD
   FUN GCD: nat ** nat -> nat

Implementation file (definition)

   IMPLEMENTATION GCD
   IMPORT Nat COMPLETELY
   DEF GCD(a,b) == IF a % b = 0 THEN b
                       ELSE IF a-b < b THEN GCD(b,a-b)
                           ELSE GCD(a-b,b)
                       FI
                   FI
