= Lustre (programming language) =

Programming language

- Paradigms: Dataflow, declarative, synchronous
- First appeared: 1980s

Lustre is a formally defined, declarative, and synchronous dataflow programming language for programming reactive systems. It began as a research project in the early 1980s. A formal presentation of the language can be found in the 1991 Proceedings of the IEEE. In 1993 it progressed to practical, industrial use in a commercial product as the core language of the industrial environment SCADE, developed by Esterel Technologies. It is now used for critical control software in aircraft, helicopters, and nuclear power plants.

== Structure of Lustre programs ==
A Lustre program is a series of node definitions, written as:

node foo(a : bool) returns (b : bool);
let
  b = not a;
tel

Where foo is the name of the node, a is the name of the single input of this node and b is the name of the single output. In this example the node foo returns the negation of its input a, which is the expected result.

=== Inner variables ===
Additional internal variables can be declared as follows:

node Nand(X,Y: bool) returns (Z: bool);
  var U: bool;
let
  U = X and Y;
  Z = not U;
tel

Note: The equations order doesn't matter, the order of lines U = X and Y; and Z = not U; doesn't change the result.

=== Special operators ===
pre p	Returns the value of p in the previous cycle
p -> q	Set p as the initial value of the expression q

== Examples ==
=== Rising Edge detection ===
node RisingEdge (X : bool) returns (E : bool);
let
  E = X and not pre X;
tel

=== Falling Edge detection ===
node FallingEdge (X : bool) returns (E : bool);
let
  E = not X and pre X;
tel

== See also ==
- Esterel
- SIGNAL (another dataflow-oriented synchronous language)
