= CEEMAC =

- Paradigm: Visual composition language
- Designed by: Brooke Boering
- Developer: Vagabondo Enterprises
- Platform: Apple II

CEEMAC is a programming language developed in the 1980s for the Apple II family of computers. It was developed by Brooke Boering and published by Vagabondo Enterprises,

CEEMAC is a visual composition language in which the programmer designs dynamic "scores" by programmatically controlling color, shape, sound and movement. A programmer can then "perform" their score through use of the Apple II keyboard or paddle input devices to introduce additional variation.

Syntax loosely resembles a combination of BASIC and Pascal and includes control commands such as GOTO, GOSUB, DO, AGAIN, FOR, SKIP, EXIT and loop control structures such as IF/WHILE and TIL/UNLESS. Additionally, 30 predefined macros aid in score composition.

CEEMAC was originally marketed through distribution of a free demonstration program entitled Fire Organ. This program contained several scores created by Boering and other programmers to demonstrate some of the capabilities of the language.

== Example ==
The following is a small CEEMAC sample score:

		    SCORE: KT
      			:FIRE ORGAN  KEY T
      			SPEED [0,0]
      			: - BUT 0
      			0
      			CLEAR [0,0]
      			XY1 = $80;$80
     			: MAIN LOOP
      			F
     			:FORGND SYMMETRY 0-3
      			VC = RND3 ORA 3
      			: SAVE FORGND ROTATION
      			VD = ROTEZ
      			:FORGND COLOR
      			COLOR = NXTCOL
