= SIGNAL (programming language) =

- Paradigm: Dataflow, Declarative, Synchronous
- Developer: Inria (Espresso team)
- First appeared: 1980s

SIGNAL is a programming language based on synchronized dataflow (flows + synchronization): a process is a set of equations on elementary flows describing both data and control.

The SIGNAL formal model provides the capability to describe systems with several clocks (polychronous systems) as relational specifications. Relations are useful as partial specifications and as specifications of non-deterministic devices (for instance a non-deterministic bus) or external processes (for instance an unsafe car driver).

Using SIGNAL allows one to specify an application, to design an architecture, to refine detailed components down to RTOS or hardware description. The SIGNAL model supports a design methodology which goes from specification to implementation, from abstraction to concretization, from synchrony to asynchrony.

SIGNAL has been mainly developed in INRIA Espresso team since the 1980s, at the same time as similar programming languages, Esterel and Lustre.

== A brief history ==
The SIGNAL language was first designed for signal processing applications in the beginning of the 1980s. It has been proposed to answer the demand of new domain-specific language for the design of signal processing applications, adopting a dataflow and block-diagram style with array and sliding window operators. P. Le Guernic, A. Benveniste, and T. Gautier have been in charge of the language definition. The first paper on SIGNAL was published in 1982, while the first complete description of SIGNAL appeared in the PhD thesis of T. Gautier. The symbolic representation of SIGNAL via z/3z (over [-1,0,1]) has been introduced in 1986. A full compiler of SIGNAL based on the clock calculus on hierarchy of Boolean clocks, was described by L. Besnard in his PhD thesis in 1992. The clock calculus has been improved later by T. Amagbegnon with the proposition of arborescent canonical forms.

During the 1990s, the application domain of the SIGNAL language has been extended into general embedded and real-time systems. The relation-oriented specification style enabled the increasing construction of the systems, and also led to the design considering multi-clocked systems, compared to the original single-clock-based implementation of Esterel and Lustre. Moreover, the design and implementation of distributed embedded systems were also taken into account in SIGNAL. The corresponding research includes the optimization methods proposed by B. Chéron, the clustering models defined by B. Le Goff, the abstraction and separate compilation formalized by O. Maffeïs, and the implementation of distributed programs developed by P. Aubry.

== The Polychrony Toolsets ==
The Polychrony toolset is an open-source development environment for critical/embedded systems based on SIGNAL, a real-time polychronous dataflow language. It provides a unified model-driven environment to perform design exploration by using top-down and bottom-up design methodologies formally supported by design model transformations from specification to implementation and from synchrony to asynchrony. It can be included in heterogeneous design systems with various input formalisms and output languages.

Polychrony is a set of tools composed of:

- A SIGNAL batch compiler
- A graphical user interface (editor + interactive access to compiling functionalities)
- The Sigali tool, an associated formal system for formal verification and controller synthesis. Sigali is developed together with the INRIA Vertecs project.

== The SME environment ==
The SME (SIGNAL Meta under Eclipse) environment is a front-end of Polychrony in the Eclipse environment based on Model-Driven Engineering (MDE) technologies. It consists of a set of Eclipse plug-ins which rely on the Eclipse Modeling Framework (EMF). The environment is built around SME, a metamodel of the SIGNAL language extended with mode automata concepts.

The SME environment is composed of several plug-ins which correspond to:

- A reflexive editor: a tree view allowing to manipulate models conform to the SME metamodel.
- A graphical modeler based on the TopCased modeling facilities (cf. previous picture).
- A reflexive editor and an Eclipse view to create compilation scenarios.
- A direct connection to the Polychrony services (compilation, formal verification, etc.).
- A documentation and model examples.

== See also ==
- Synchronous programming language
- Dataflow programming
- Globally asynchronous locally synchronous
- Formal verification
- Model checking
- Formal semantics of programming languages
- AADL
- Simulink
- Avionics
- System design
- Asynchrony (computer programming)
