= TUNIS =

Unix-like operating system, developed at the University of Toronto in the early 1980s

TUNIS (Toronto University System)
- Developer: University of Toronto
- Written in: Concurrent Euclid
- OS family: Unix-like
- Supported platforms: PDP-11, Motorola 6809 and 68000, National Semiconductor 32016

TUNIS (Toronto University System) is a Unix-like operating system, developed at the University of Toronto in the early 1980s. TUNIS was a portable operating system compatible with Unix V7, but with a completely redesigned kernel, written in Concurrent Euclid. Programs that ran under Unix V7 could be run under TUNIS with no modification.

TUNIS was designed for teaching, and was intended to provide a model for the design of well-structured, highly portable, easily understood Unix-like operating systems. It made extensive use of Concurrent Euclid modules to isolate machine dependencies and provide a clean internal structure through information hiding. TUNIS also made use of Concurrent Euclid's built-in processes and synchronization features to make it easy to understand and maintain.

TUNIS targeted the PDP-11, Motorola 6809 and 68000, and National Semiconductor 32016 architectures, and supported distribution across multiple CPUs using Concurrent Euclid's synchronization features.
