= SOPHAEROS =

Computer code

SOPHAEROS is a computer code, used by the AECL and French Nuclear program to simulate the transfer of fission products in the reactor chamber. It models fission product behaviour using a set of aerosol dynamic rules, and is used by AECL in fuel channel safety analyses.
