= Manifest typing =

Explicit identification of variable type

In computer science, manifest typing is explicit identification by the software programmer of the type of each variable being declared. For example: if variable X is going to store integers then its type must be declared as integer. The term "manifest typing" is often used with the term latent typing to describe the difference between the static, compile-time type membership of the object and its run-time type identity.

In contrast, some programming languages use implicit typing (a.k.a. type inference) where the type is deduced from context at compile-time or allow for dynamic typing in which the variable is just declared and may be assigned a value of any type at runtime.

It's important to know the difference between manifest/implicit typing and static/dynamic typing. The first one describes how the variables (and its types) are defined, while the second describes whether the language checks the types at compile or execution time.

== Examples ==
Consider the following example written in the C programming language:

#include <stdio.h>

int main(void) {
    char s[] = "Test String";
    float x = 0.0f;
    int y = 0;

    printf("Hello, World!\n");
    return 0;
}

The variables s, x, and y were declared as a character array, floating point number, and an integer, respectively. The type system rejects, at compile-time, such fallacies as trying to add s and x. Since C23, type inference can be used in C with the keyword auto. Using that feature, the preceding example could become:

#include <stdio.h>

int main(void) {
    char s[] = "Test String"; 
    // auto s = "Test String"; is instead equivalent to char* s = "Test String";
    auto x = 0.0f;
    auto y = 0;

    printf("Hello, World!\n");
    return 0;
}

Similarly to the second example, in Standard ML, the types do not need to be explicitly declared. Instead, the type is determined by the type of the assigned expression.

let val s = "Test String"
    val x = 0.0
    val y = 0
in print "Hello, World!\n"
end

There are no manifest types in this program, but the compiler still infers the types string, real and int for them, and would reject the expression s+x as a compile-time error.
