= Script.NET =

Programming language

- Paradigm: imperative, meta, scripting
- Developer: Microsoft
- Typing discipline: dynamic
- Platform: .NET Framework
- License: Free
- Website: www.protsyk.com/scriptdotnet

Influenced by
- JavaScript

Script.NET or S# is a metaprogramming language that provides scripting functionality in Microsoft .NET applications, allowing runtime execution of custom functionality, similar to VBA in Microsoft Office applications. The syntax of Script.NET is similar to JavaScript. It is designed to be simple and efficient scripting language allowing to customize .NET applications. The language has a true runtime interpreter, and it is executed without generating additional in-memory assemblies.

Script.NET is an open-source project.

== Metaprogramming features ==
Script.NET has a special quotation operator <[ program ]> which returns the AST of a given program. Additionally, the AST of the current program may be accessed with the prog object.

Here is an example:

//Create an AST for MessageBox.Show('Hello'); program
ast = <[ MessageBox.Show('Hello'); ]>;
//Add this AST at the end of the current program
prog.AppendAst(ast);

The <[ ... ]> operator and prog objects allow Script.NET to generate new scripts or modify existing scripts at runtime.

== Generalized objects ==
Script.NET includes so-called "Mutantic Framework" which introduces a special kind of "meta" objects for controlling objects of any type. It is composed of a set of classes, on top of which is the "DataMutant" class. It implements several principles of mutant object:

=== Definition ===
A Mutant is a special object which could have all properties (fields, methods, etc.), and may be converted to any type (or assigned to object of any type). The semantics of such conversion (or assignment) are pragmatically conditional.

There is a special operator := called Mutantic or Generalized assignment. Its purpose is to assign values of DataMutant fields to corresponding fields of an object of any type.

Example. Creation and Usage of MObject:

 // Create Data Mutant Object
 mobj = [ Text -> 'Hello from Mutant' ];
 // Set Additional Fields
 mobj{{Not a typo|.}}Top = 0;
 mobj{{Not a typo|.}}Left = 0;
 // Set corresponding fields of Windows Form object
 // (Mutantic Assignment)
 form := mobj;

== Examples ==
=== Hello world ===
 MessageBox.Show('Hello!');

=== Bubble sort without output function ===
a=[17, 0, 5, 3,1, 2, 55];
for (i=0; i < a.Length; i=i+1)
 for (j=i+1; j <  a.Length; j=j+1)
   if (a[i] > a[j] )
   {
     temp = a[i]; 
     a[i] = a[j];
     a[j] = temp;
   }

s = 'Results:';
for (i=0; i < a.Length; i++)
  s = s + ',' + a[i];

MessageBox.Show(s);

=== RSS Reader ===
a = new XmlDocument();
a.Load('http://www.codeplex.com/scriptdotnet/Project/ProjectRss.aspx');
 
MessageBox.Show('CodePlex Script.NET RSS::');
foreach (n in a.SelectNodes('/rss/channel/item/title'))
  MessageBox.Show(n.InnerText);

=== Stack ===
Stack limited to 20 elements using Design by contract feature

function Push(item)
[
//Limit to 10 items
 pre(me{{Not a typo|.}}Count < 10 ); 
 post();
 invariant();
]
{
 //me is mutated object, 
 //stack in this case
 me.Push(item);
}

function Pop()
[//Check emptiness hardik
 pre(me{{Not a typo|.}}Count > 0);
 post();
 invariant();
]
{
 return me.Pop();
}

stack = new Stack<|int|>();

//Create Mutant hardik
//1. Set Functions, override stack{{Not a typo|.}}Push
mObject=[Push->Push,PopCheck->Pop];
//2. Capture object
mObject.Mutate(stack);

for (i=0; i<5; i++)
  mObject.Push(i);

Console.WriteLine((string)mObject.PopCheck());

== See also ==
- L Sharp - Lisp-like scripting language for .NET
- Boo - a Python Like language for .NET platform
- IronPython - an implementation of Python for the .NET platform, similar to Jython.
- Nemerle - a high-level language for the .NET platform.
