= PLEXIL =

- Paradigm: Multi-paradigm
- Designed by: NASA
- First appeared: 2005
- Typing discipline: Static, unsafe, nominative
- OS: Linux, Mac OS
- License: Open source
- Website: https://github.com/plexil-group/plexil

Major implementations
- Robotics, Space missions

PLEXIL (Plan Execution Interchange Language) is an open source technology for automation, created and currently in development by NASA.

== Overview ==
PLEXIL is a programming language for representing plans for automation.

PLEXIL is used in automation technologies such as the NASA K10 rover, Mars Curiosity rover's percussion drill, Deep Space Habitat and Habitat Demonstration Unit, Edison Demonstration of Smallsat Networks, LADEE, Autonomy Operating System (AOS) and procedure automation for the International Space Station.

The PLEXIL Executive is an execution engine that implements PLEXIL and can be interfaced (using a provided software framework) with external systems to be controlled and/or queried. PLEXIL has been used to demonstrate automation technologies targeted at future NASA space missions.

The binaries and documentation are widely available as BSD licensed open source from GitHub.

== Nodes ==
The fundamental programming unit of PLEXIL is the Node. A node is a data structure formed of two primary components: a set of conditions that drive the execution of the node and another set which specifies what the node accomplishes after execution.

A hierarchical composition of nodes is called a plan. A plan is a tree divided in nodes close to the root (high level nodes) and leaf nodes that represent primitive actions such as variable assignments or the sending of commands to the external system.

Node Types:

As of September 2008 NASA has implemented seven types of nodes.

- List nodes: List nodes are the internal nodes in a plan. These nodes have child nodes that can be of any type.
- Command nodes: These nodes issue commands that drive the system.
- Assignment nodes: Performs a local operation and assigns a value to a variable.
- Function call nodes: Accesses external functions that perform computations, but do not alter the state of the system.
- Update nodes: Provides information to the planning and decision support interface.
- Library call nodes: These nodes invoke nodes in an external library.
- Empty nodes: Nodes that contain attributes and do not perform any actions.

Node states:

Each node can be in only one state. They are:

- Inactive
- Waiting
- Executing
- Finishing
- Iteration_Ended
- Failing
- Finished

Nodes transitions:

- SkipCondition T : The skip condition changes from unknown or false to true.
- StartCondition T : The start condition changes from unknown or false to true.
- InvariantCondition F/U : Invariant condition changes from true to false or unknown.
- EndCondition T : End condition changes to true.
- Ancestor_inv_condition F/U : The invariant condition of any ancestor changes to false or unknown.
- Ancestor_end_condition T : The end condition of any ancestor changes to true.
- All_children_waiting_or_finished T : This is true when all child nodes are either in node state waiting or finished.
- Command_abort_complete T : When the abort for a command action is completed.
- Function_abort_complete T : The abort of a function call is completed.
- Parent_waiting T : The (single) parent of the node transitions to node state waiting.
- Parent_executing T : The (single) parent of the node transitions to node state executing.
- RepeatCondition T/F : the repeat condition changes from unknown to either true or false.

== See also ==
- List of robotics software

== See also ==
- Spacecraft command language
- Cybernetics
- Space exploration
