= LIS (programming language) =

Programming language

LIS (Language d'Implementation de Systèmes) was a system implementation programming language designed by Jean Ichbiah, who later designed Ada.

LIS was based on Pascal and Simula. It was used to implement the compiler for the Ada-0 subset of Ada at Karlsruhe on the BS2000 Siemens operating system. Later on the Karlsruhe Ada compilation system got rewritten in Ada-0 itself, which was easy, because LIS and Ada-0 are very close.
