= Ric Holt =

American-Canadian computer scientist (1941–2019)

- Born: Richard Craig Holt; February 13, 1941; Bartlesville, Oklahoma, US
- Died: April 12, 2019 (aged 78); Quadra Island, British Columbia, Canada

Academic background
- Education: Cornell University
- Thesis: On deadlock in computer systems (1971)
- Doctoral advisor: Alan Shaw

Academic work
- Discipline: Computer Science
- Sub-discipline: Programming languages
- Institutions: University of Toronto, University of Waterloo
- Notable works: Turing (programming language)

Richard Craig Holt (February 13, 1941 – April 12, 2019) was an American-Canadian computer scientist.

== Early life ==
Holt was born in 1941, in Bartlesville, Oklahoma, to Vashti Young and C.P. Holt, but later moved to Toronto, Canada. As a teenager, he competed in track and field. He graduated from Cornell University in 1964 in engineering physics. He spent a year in the Peace Corps in Nigeria, and then worked for IBM. He went back to Cornell and obtained a PhD in computer science in 1970 under Alan Shaw.

== Career ==
Holt joined the faculty at the University of Toronto in 1970. In 1997, he joined the faculty of the University of Waterloo, where he remained until his retirement in 2014.

Holt's main research areas were operating systems, programming languages and software engineering, contributing many seminal results to each. His work includes foundational work on deadlock, development of several compilers and compilation techniques. His Turing programming language was used in universities and high schools in Canada and internationally. He also participated in the development of the Grok, Euclid, SP/k, and S/SL programming languages. For many years, he ran a software company, Holt Software Associates (HSA), which created the Ready to Program environment still widely used in Canadian High Schools to teach programming.

Holt served as president of Gravel Watch Ontario from 2003 until 2015.

In the fall of 2005, he was named #16 on Computing Canada's list of top 30 information technology movers and shakers in the country for the past 30 years. In 2017, Holt was awarded the OS-CAN/INFO-CAN Lifetime Achievement Award.

== Death ==
Holt died on April 12, 2019, on Quadra Island, British Columbia, Canada at the age of 78. He had Parkinson's disease and Lewy body dementia in his later years.

== Ric Holt Early Career Achievement Award ==
In 2019 the Mining Software Repositories conference, the flagship conference in the area of repository mining that has been co-founded by Ric Holt, has established the Ric Holt Early Career Achievement Award. The first awardees are Emad Shihab (2019; Concordia University), Alberto Bacchelli (2020; University of Zurich) and Bogdan Vasilescu (2021; Carnegie Mellon University). The more recent awardees are:

Year	Name	Affiliation
2022	Gustavo Pinto	Federal University of Pará, Brazil
2023	Li Li	Beihang University, China
2024	Patanamon (Pick) Thongtanunam	University of Melbourne, Australia
2025	Ayushi Rastogi	University of Groningen

== See also ==
- List of University of Waterloo people
