= RTL/2 =

Programming language

- Paradigms: Multi-paradigm: imperative, structured, real-time
- Family: ALGOL
- Designed by: J.G.P. Barnes
- Developer: Imperial Chemical Industries
- First appeared: 1972; 53 years ago
- Typing discipline: static, strong, safe, structural
- Scope: Lexical
- Platform: PDP-11, VAX
- OS: Cross- (multi-) platformRSX-11M, VMS

Dialects
- none

Influenced by
- ALGOL 68

RTL/2 (Real-Time Language) is a discontinued high-level programming language for use in real-time computing, developed at Imperial Chemical Industries, Ltd. (ICI), by J.G.P. Barnes. It was originally used internally in ICI but was distributed by SPL International in 1974. It was based on concepts from ALGOL 68, and intended to be small and simple. RTL/2 was standardised in 1980 by the British Standards Institution.

== Language overview ==
The data types in RTL/2 were strongly typed, with separate compiling. The compilation units contained one or more items named bricks, i.e.:

- Procedure bricks
- Data bricks
- Stack bricks

A procedure brick was a procedure, which may or may not return a (scalar) value, have (scalar) parameters, or have local (scalar) variables. The entry mechanism and implementation of local variables was reentrant. Non-scalar data could only be accessed via reference (so-called REF variables were considered scalar).

A data brick was a named static collection of scalars, arrays and records. There was no heap or garbage collection, so programmers had to implement memory management manually.

A stack brick was an area of storage reserved for running all the procedures of a single process and contained the call stack, local variables and other housekeeping items. The extent to which stack bricks were used varied depending on the host environment in which RTL/2 programs ran.

Access to the host environment of an RTL/2 program was provided via special procedure and data bricks called SVC procedures and SVC data. These were accessible in RTL/2 but implemented in some other language in the host environment.

== Hello World ==
TITLE Hello World;

LET NL=10;

EXT PROC(REF ARRAY BYTE) TWRT;

ENT PROC RRJOB() INT;
TWRT("Hello World#NL#");
RETURN(1);
ENDPROC;

== Embedded assembly ==
RTL/2 compiles to assembly language and provides the CODE statement to allow including assembly language in RTL/2 source code. This is only available when compiled with a systems programming option (CN:F)

The CODE statement takes two operands: the number of bytes used by the code insert and the number of bytes of stack used.

Within code statements two trip characters are used to access RTL/2 variables. These vary between different operating systems. On a Digital Equipment Corporation (DEC) PDP-11 running RSX-11M, and a VAX running VMS, the trip characters are * and /.

While the specifics varied by operating system the following is an example of a code insert on VAX/VMS:

CODE 6,0;
JMP CODE_ENT ; This code insert can be set to a fixed length as it jumps to a new psect.
; this method is especially useful on systems such as VMS where the length of
; instructions is variable
.SAVE_PSECT ; Save current program section
.PSECT ASMB_CODE,EXE,NOWRT,LONG
CODE_ENT:
MOVL *PARAM1(AP),*COUNTER/MYDATA
JMP CODE_EX
.RESTORE_PSECT
CODE_EX:
*RTL

This code insert moves the value of a variable passed into the RTL/2 procedure into a variable named COUNTER in a data brick named MYDATA.

== Reserved words ==
- ABS
- AND
- ARRAY
- BIN
- BLOCK
- BY
- BYTE
- CODE
- DATA
- DO
- ELSE
- ELSEIF
- END
- ENDBLOCK
- ENDDATA
- ENDPROC
- ENT
- EXT
- FOR
- FRAC
- GOTO
- HEX
- IF
- INT
- LABEL
- LAND
- LENGTH
- LET
- LOR
- MOD
- NEV
- NOT
- OCT
- OF
- OPTION
- OR
- PROC
- REAL
- REF
- REP
- RETURN
- RTL
- SHA
- SHL
- SLA
- SLL
- SRA
- SRL
- STACK
- SVC
- SWITCH
- THEN
- TITLE
- TO
- VAL
- WHILE
