= Object-oriented operating system =

Operating system

An object-oriented operating system is an operating system that is designed, structured, and operated using object-oriented programming principles.

An object-oriented operating system is in contrast to an object-oriented user interface or programming framework, which can be run on a non-object-oriented operating system like Unix.

There are already object-based language concepts involved in the design of a more typical operating system such as Unix. While a more traditional language like C does not support object-orientation as fluidly as more recent languages, the notion of, for example, a file, stream, or device driver (in Unix, each represented as a file descriptor) can be considered a good example of objects. They are, after all, abstract data types, with various methods in the form of system calls which behavior varies based on the type of object and which implementation details are hidden from the caller.

Object-orientation has been defined as objects + inheritance, and inheritance is only one approach to the more general problem of delegation that occurs in every operating system. Object-orientation has been more widely used in the user interfaces of operating systems than in their kernels.

== Background ==
An object is an instance of a class, which provides a certain set of functionalities. Two objects can be differentiated based on the functionalities (or methods) they support. In an operating system context, objects are associated with a resource. Historically, the object-oriented design principles were used in operating systems to provide several protection mechanisms.

Protection mechanisms in an operating system help in providing a clear separation between different user programs. It also protects the operating system from any malicious user program behavior. For example, consider the case of user profiles in an operating system. The user should not have access to resources of another user. The object model deals with these protection issues with each resource acting as an object. Every object can perform only a set of operations. In the context of user profiles, the set of operations is limited by privilege level of a user.

Present-day operating systems use object-oriented design principles for many components of the system, which includes protection.

== Examples ==
Athene
Athene is an object-based operating system first released in 2000 by Rocklyte Systems. The user environment was constructed entirely from objects that are linked together at runtime. Applications for Athene could also be created using this methodology and were commonly scripted using the object scripting language Dynamic Markup Language (DML). Objects could have been shared between processes by creating them in shared memory and locking them as needed for access. Athene's object framework was multi-platform, allowing it to be used in Windows and Linux environments for developing object-oriented programs. The company went defunct and the project abandoned sometime in 2009.
BeOS
BeOS was an object-oriented operating system released in 1995, which used objects and the C++ language for the application programming interface (API). The kernel was written in C with C++ wrappers in user space. The OS did not see mainstream usage and proved commercially unviable, however it has seen continued usage and development by a small enthusiast community.
Choices
Choices is an object-oriented operating system developed at the University of Illinois at Urbana–Champaign. It is written in C++ and uses objects to represent core kernel components like the central processing unit (CPU), processes, and so on. Inheritance is used to separate the kernel into portable machine-independent classes and small non-portable dependent classes. Choices has been ported to and runs on SPARC, x86, and ARM.
ETHOS
ETHOS was an experimental object oriented version of the Oberon System (see below) created by Clemens Szyperski for his PhD Thesis written in Oberon-2
GEOS
PC/GEOS is an object-oriented, multitasking, graphical operating system, released in 1990, with window and desktop management including scalable fonts. It is written in an object-oriented x86 assembly language dialect and some C/C++ and runs under MS-DOS. GEOS was developed by Berkeley Softworks and continues to be maintained by BreadBox Computer Company. Related software suites were named Ensemble and New Deal Office. Adaptations exist for various palmtops, and 32-bit systems with non-x86-CPUs.
Haiku
Haiku (originally named OpenBeOS), is an open-source replacement for BeOS. It reached its first development milestone in September 2009 with the release of Haiku R1/Alpha 1. The x86 distribution is compatible with BeOS at both source and binary level. Like BeOS, it is written primarily in C++ and provides an object-oriented API. It is actively developed.
IBM i (OS/400, i5/OS)
IBM introduced OS/400 in 1988. This OS ran exclusively on the AS/400 platform. Renamed IBM i in 2008, this operating system and runs exclusively on Power Systems which also can run AIX and Linux. IBM i uses an object-oriented methodology and integrates a database (Db2 for i). The IBM i OS has a 128-bit unique identifier for each object.
IBM OS/2 2.0
IBM's first priority based pre-emptive multitasking, graphical, windows-based operating system included an object-oriented user shell. It was designed for the Intel 80386 that used virtual 8086 mode with full 32-bit support and was released in 1992. ArcaOS, a new OS/2 based operating system initially called Blue Lion is being developed by Arca Noae. The first version was released in May 2017.
IBM TopView
TopView was an object-oriented operating environment that loaded on a PC on DOS, and then took control from DOS. At that point it effectively became an object-oriented operating system with an object-oriented API (TopView API). It was IBM's first multi-tasking, window based, object-oriented operating system for the PC led by David C. Morrill and released in February 1985.
Java-based
Given that Oracle's (formerly Sun Microsystems') Java is today one of the most dominant object-oriented languages, it is no surprise that Java-based operating systems have been attempted. In this area, ideally, the kernel would consist of the bare minimum needed to support a Java virtual machine (JVM). This is the only component of such an operating system that would have to be written in a language other than Java. Built on the JVM and basic hardware support, it would be possible to write the rest of the operating system in Java; even parts of the system that are more traditionally written in a lower-level language such as C, for example device drivers, can be written in Java.
Examples of attempts at such an operating system include JavaOS, JOS, JNode, and JX.
Lisp-based
An object-oriented operating system written in the Lisp dialect Lisp Machine Lisp (and later Common Lisp) was developed at MIT. It was commercialized with Lisp machines from Symbolics, Lisp Machines Inc. and Texas Instruments. Symbolics called their operating system Genera. It was developed with the Flavors object-oriented extension of Lisp, then with New Flavors, and then with the Common Lisp Object System (CLOS).
Xerox developed several workstations with an operating system written in Interlisp-D. Interlisp-D provided object-oriented extensions like LOOPS and CLOS.
Movitz and Mezzano are two more recent attempts at operating systems written in Common Lisp.
Medos-2
Medos-2 is a single user, object-oriented operating system made for the Lilith line of workstations (processor: Advanced Micro Devices (AMD) 2901), developed in the early 1980s at ETH Zurich by Svend Erik Knudsen with advice from Niklaus Wirth. It is built entirely from modules of the programming language Modula-2. It was succeeded at ETH Zurich by the Oberon system (see also below), and a variant named Excelsior was developed for the Kronos workstation, by the Academy of Sciences of the Soviet Union, Siberian branch, Novosibirsk Computing Center, Modular Asynchronous Developable Systems (MARS) project, Kronos Research Group (KRG).
Microsoft Singularity
Singularity is an experimental operating system based on Microsoft's .NET Framework. It is comparable to Java-based operating systems.
Microsoft Windows NT
Windows NT is a family of operating systems (including Windows 7, 8, Phone 8, 8.1, Windows 10, 10 Mobile, Windows 11 and Xbox) produced by Microsoft, the first version of which was released in July 1993. It is a high-level programming language-based, processor-independent, multiprocessing, multi-user operating system. It is best described as object-based rather than object-oriented as it does not include the full inheritance properties of object-oriented languages.
The Object Manager is in charge of managing NT objects. As part of this responsibility, it maintains an internal namespace where various operating system components, device drivers, and Win32 programs can store and lookup objects. The NT Native API provides routines that allow user space (mode) programs to browse the namespace and query the status of objects located there, but the interfaces are undocumented. NT supports per-object (file, function, and role) access control lists allowing a rich set of security permissions to be applied to systems and services. WinObj is a Windows NT program that uses the NT Native API (provided by NTDLL.DLL) to access and display information on the NT Object Manager's name space.

Component Object Model
On the user mode side of Windows, the Component Object Model (COM) is an application binary interface standard for software components introduced by Microsoft in 1993. It is used to enable interprocess communication and dynamic object creation in a large range of programming languages. COM is the basis for several other Microsoft technologies and frameworks, including Object Linking and Embedding (OLE), OLE Automation, ActiveX, COM+, Distributed Component Object Model (DCOM), the Windows shell, DirectX, and Windows Runtime. OLE is a proprietary technology developed by Microsoft that allows embedding and linking to documents and other objects. On a technical level, an OLE object is any object that implements the IOleObject interface, possibly along with a wide range of other interfaces, depending on the object's needs. Its primary use is for managing compound documents, but it is also used for transferring data between different applications using drag and drop and clipboard operations.
Compound File Binary Format
Compound File Binary Format (CFBF) is a file format for storing many files and streams within one file on a disk. CFBF is developed by Microsoft and is an implementation of Microsoft COM Structured Storage. Structured storage is widely used as main file format in Microsoft Office applications including Microsoft Word, Microsoft Excel, Microsoft PowerPoint, Microsoft Access and is the basis of Advanced Authoring Format.
Object Linking and Embedding
Object Linking and Embedding (OLE) was part of a grander plan named Cairo, the code name for a project at Microsoft from 1991 to 1996. Its charter was to build technologies for a next generation operating system that would fulfill Bill Gates' vision of "information at your fingertips". Cairo never shipped, although parts of its technologies have since appeared in other products. The Windows 95 graphical user interface was based on the initial design work that was done on the Cairo user interface. The remaining component is the object-based file system. It was once planned to be implemented in the form of Windows Future Storage (WinFS) as part of Windows Vista. WinFS is the code name for data storage and management system project based on relational databases, running on the Windows NT file system (NTFS), which is object-oriented in that it can store the NT objects including its NT object identifier. Each NTFS object has an object identifier; a shortcut with a target that's on an NTFS volume also records the object identifier of the shortcut target, and the object identifier of the drive. WinFS was first demonstrated in 2003 as an advanced storage subsystem for the Microsoft Windows operating system, designed for persistence and management of structured, semi-structured, and unstructured data. WinFS development was cancelled in June 2006, with some of its technologies merged into other Microsoft products such as Microsoft SQL Server 2008 and Microsoft SharePoint. It was subsequently confirmed in an interview with Bill Gates that Microsoft planned to migrate applications like Windows Media Player, Windows Photo Gallery, Microsoft Office Outlook, etc., to use WinFS as the data storage back-end.

NeXTSTEP
During the late 1980s, Steve Jobs formed the computer company NeXT. One of NeXT's first tasks was to design an object-oriented operating system, NeXTSTEP. They did this by adding an object-oriented framework on Mach and BSD using the Objective-C language as a basis. It achieved a niche status in the computing market, notably used by Tim Berners-Lee developing the first implementation of the World Wide Web.
NeXTStep later evolved into OpenStep and the Cocoa API on macOS and iOS (iPadOS, watchOS).
OpenStep was provided as an API layer on many operating systems, namely HP-UX, NextStep, Solaris, and Windows.
Oberon System
Oberon System is a single user, object-oriented operating system made for the Ceres line of workstations (processor: National Semiconductor NS32000), developed in the later 1980s at ETH Zurich by Niklaus Wirth and Jürg Gutknecht. It is built entirely from modules of the programming language Oberon. There are two successors of the Oberon System, ETHOS (see above) and, as of 2023 still maintained, an evolution named Active Object System (AOS), then renamed Bluebottle, then renamed A2.
OOSMOS
The Object-Oriented State Machine Operating System (OOSMOS), written in C, promotes object-oriented encapsulation and implements a full table-driven hierarchical state machine architecture. It generates C code directly from state charts drawn with the open source tool UMLet. OOSMOS also supports a unique feature call 'state threads' which allows a thread of execution per state. OOSMOS operates on a bare board or in cooperation with an existing operating system.
Phantom OS
Phantom OS adheres to a principle where "everything is an object" and eliminates the concept of a file entirely, instead transparently persisting virtual memory to storage.
ReactOS
ReactOS is an open-source operating system intended to be binary compatible with application software and device drivers made for Microsoft Windows NT versions. Written from scratch, it aims to follow the architecture of Windows NT designed by Microsoft from the hardware level right through to the application level.
Smalltalk
Smalltalk was invented at Xerox in the 1970s. The Smalltalk system is fully object-oriented and needs very little support by BIOS and the run-time system.
Syllable
Syllable makes heavy use of C++ and for that reason is often compared to BeOS.
Symbolics Genera
Genera from Symbolics is an operating system for Lisp machines written in ZetaLisp and Symbolics Common Lisp. It makes heavy use of Flavors (an early object-oriented extension to Lisp) and the Common Lisp Object System (CLOS). Development began in the mid 70s at MIT.
Taligent
Taligent was an object-oriented operating system project, begun by Apple Inc. and jointly developed with IBM in the 1990s. It was later spun off to an IBM subsidiary and transformed from an operating system to a programming environment.

== See also ==
- Operating system
- Object-oriented design
- Object-oriented programming
- Plan 9 from Bell Labs
- Zircon core platform that powers Fuchsia
