= Ceres (workstation) =

ETH Zurich computer

Ceres Workstation
- Developer: ETH Zurich
- Manufacturer: ETH Zurich
- Product family: Wirth
- Type: workstation
- Released: 1987; 39 years ago
- Discontinued: Yes
- Media: Floppy disk: Ceres 1: 5.25 in (13.3 cm); Ceres 3: 3.5 in (8.9 cm)
- Operating system: Oberon System
- CPU: NS32000
- Memory: 2 MB DRAM + 256 KB video RAM
- Dimensions: 18.5 in × 7.5 in × 14.5 in (47 cm × 19 cm × 37 cm)
- Marketing target: Research
- Predecessor: Lilith
- Successor: Ceres-2, Ceres-3

The Ceres Workstation was a workstation computer built by Niklaus Wirth's group at ETH Zurich in 1987. The central processing unit (CPU) is a National Semiconductor NS32000, and the operating system, named Oberon System is written fully in the object-oriented programming language Oberon. It is an early example of an operating system using basic object-oriented principles and garbage collection on the system level and a document centered approach for the user interface (UI), as envisaged later with OpenDoc. Ceres was a follow-up project to the Lilith workstation, based on AMD bit slicing technology and the programming language Modula-2.

On the same hardware, Clemens Szyperski implemented as part of his Doctor of Philosophy (PhD) thesis an operating system named ETHOS, which takes full advantage of object-oriented technologies. A Usenet posting by Szyperski says that Oberon/F, which was later renamed to BlackBox Component Builder, incorporates ETHOS ideas and principles.

== Links ==
- ETH Computer Science History: Lilith & Ceres
- Ceres-1 and Ceres-3 at the Computer History Museum, Mountain View, California, USA (see also its publications, especially pages 6 & 7 of Core 3.1)
- Heeb, Beat (November 1988). "Design of the Processor-Board for the Ceres-2 Workstation" (PDF). Technical Reports D-INFK. 93. ETH Zürich. doi:10.3929/ethz-a-000491598. (ETH Technical Report 93)
- Heeb, Beat; Noack, Immo (1991). "Hardware Description of the Workstation Ceres-3" (PDF). Technical Reports D-INFK. 168. ETH Zürich. doi:10.3929/ethz-a-000609403. (ETH Technical Report 168)
