= Algorithms + Data Structures = Programs =

1976 computer science book by Niklaus Wirth

- Author: Niklaus Wirth
- Subject: programming, algorithms and data structures
- Genre: Non-fiction
- Publication date: 1976
- Pages: 366

Algorithms + Data Structures = Programs is a 1976 book written by Niklaus Wirth covering some of the fundamental topics of system engineering, computer programming, particularly that algorithms and data structures are inherently related. For example, if one has a sorted list one will use a search algorithm optimal for sorted lists.

The book is one of the most influential computer science books of its time and, like Wirth's other work, has been used extensively in education.

The Turbo Pascal compiler written by Anders Hejlsberg was largely inspired by the Tiny Pascal compiler in Niklaus Wirth's book.

== Chapter outline ==
- Chapter 1 - Fundamental Data Structures
- Chapter 2 - Sorting
- Chapter 3 - Recursive Algorithms
- Chapter 4 - Dynamic Information Structures
- Chapter 5 - Language Structures and Compilers
- Appendix A - the ASCII character set
- Appendix B - Pascal syntax diagrams

== Later editions ==
A revised edition was published in 1985 with the title Algorithms and Data Structures, 288 pages. It used Modula-2 instead of Pascal. There is a later version available in digital form which uses Oberon. Chapter 5 has been replaced with a chapter titled "Key Transformations (Hashing)".

== See also ==
- List of computer programming books
