= Lilith (computer) =

1980 custom-built workstation computer

DISER Lilith
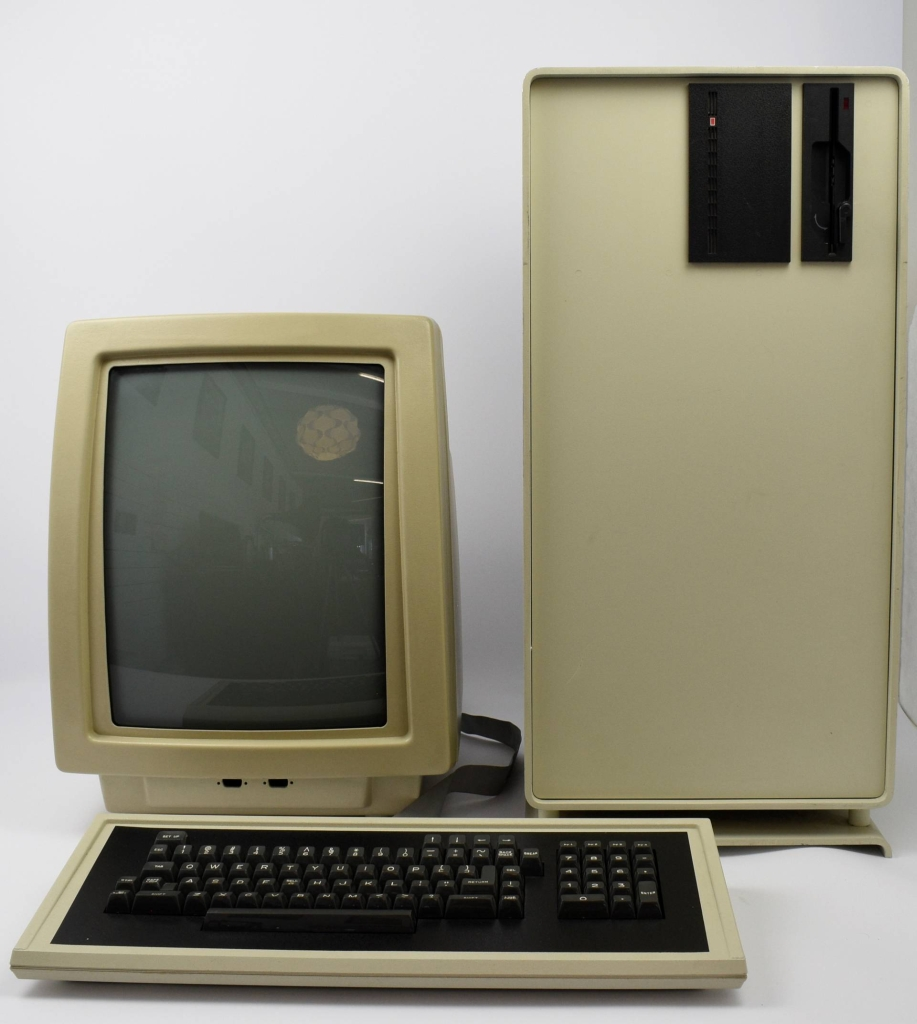
- Developer: ETH Zurich
- Manufacturer: Modula Computer Systems
- Product family: Wirth
- Type: workstation
- Released: 1980; 46 years ago
- Introductory price: $8000
- Discontinued: Yes
- Units sold: 120
- Units shipped: 120
- Media: Floppy disk 5.25 in (13.3 cm) 140 K
- Operating system: Medos-2 (Modula-2)
- CPU: AMD 2901
- Memory: 256 K (131,072 16-bit words)
- Storage: 15 MB hard disk
- Display: 12 in (30 cm) monochrome 594 x 768 bitmapped
- Dimensions: 15.5 in × 15 in × 14.5 in (39 cm × 38 cm × 37 cm)
- Marketing target: Research
- Successor: Ceres

The DISER Lilith is a custom-built workstation computer based on the Advanced Micro Devices (AMD) 2901 bit-slicing processor, created by a group led by Niklaus Wirth at ETH Zurich. The project began in 1977, and by 1984 several hundred workstations were in use. It has a high-resolution full-page portrait oriented cathode-ray tube display, a mouse, a laser printer interface, and a computer networking interface. Its software is written fully in Modula-2 and includes a relational database program named Lidas.

The Lilith processor architecture is a stack machine. Citing from Svend Erik Knudsen's contribution to "The Art of Simplicity": "Lilith's clock speed was around 7 MHz and enabled Lilith to execute between 1 and 2 million instructions (called M-code) per second. (...) Initially, the main memory was planned to have 65,536 16-bit words memory, but soon after its first version, it was enlarged to twice that capacity. For regular Modula-2 programs however, only the initial 65,536 words were usable for storage of variables."

== History ==
The development of Lilith was influenced by the Xerox Alto from the Xerox PARC (1973) where Niklaus Wirth spent a sabbatical from 1976 to 1977. Unable to bring back one of the Alto systems to Europe, Wirth decided to build a new system from scratch between 1978 and 1980, selling it under the company name DISER (Data Image Sound Processor and Emitter Receiver System). In 1985, he had a second sabbatical leave to PARC, which led to the design of the Oberon System. Ceres, the follow-up to Lilith, was released in 1987.

== Operating system ==
Medos-2
- Developer: Svend Erik Knudsen
- Written in: Modula-2
- OS family: Wirth
- Working state: Discontinued
- Marketing target: Research
- Available in: English
- Update method: Compile from source code
- Package manager: Modula-2 modules
- Supported platforms: Lilith (AMD 2901)
- Kernel type: Modular, object-oriented
- Succeeded by: Oberon

The Lilith operating system, named Medos-2, was developed at ETH Zurich, by Svend Erik Knudsen with advice from Wirth. It is a single-user, object-oriented operating system built from modules of Modula-2.

Its design influenced the design of the operating system Excelsior, developed for the Soviet Kronos workstation (see below), by the Kronos Research Group (KRG).

== Soviet variants ==
From 1986 into the early 1990s, Soviet Union technologists created and produced a line of printed circuit board systems, and workstations based on them, all named Kronos. The workstations were based on Lilith, and made in small numbers.

== Mouse ==
The computer mouse of the Lilith was custom designed, and later used with the Smaky computers. It then inspired the first mice produced by Logitech.

== Gallery ==
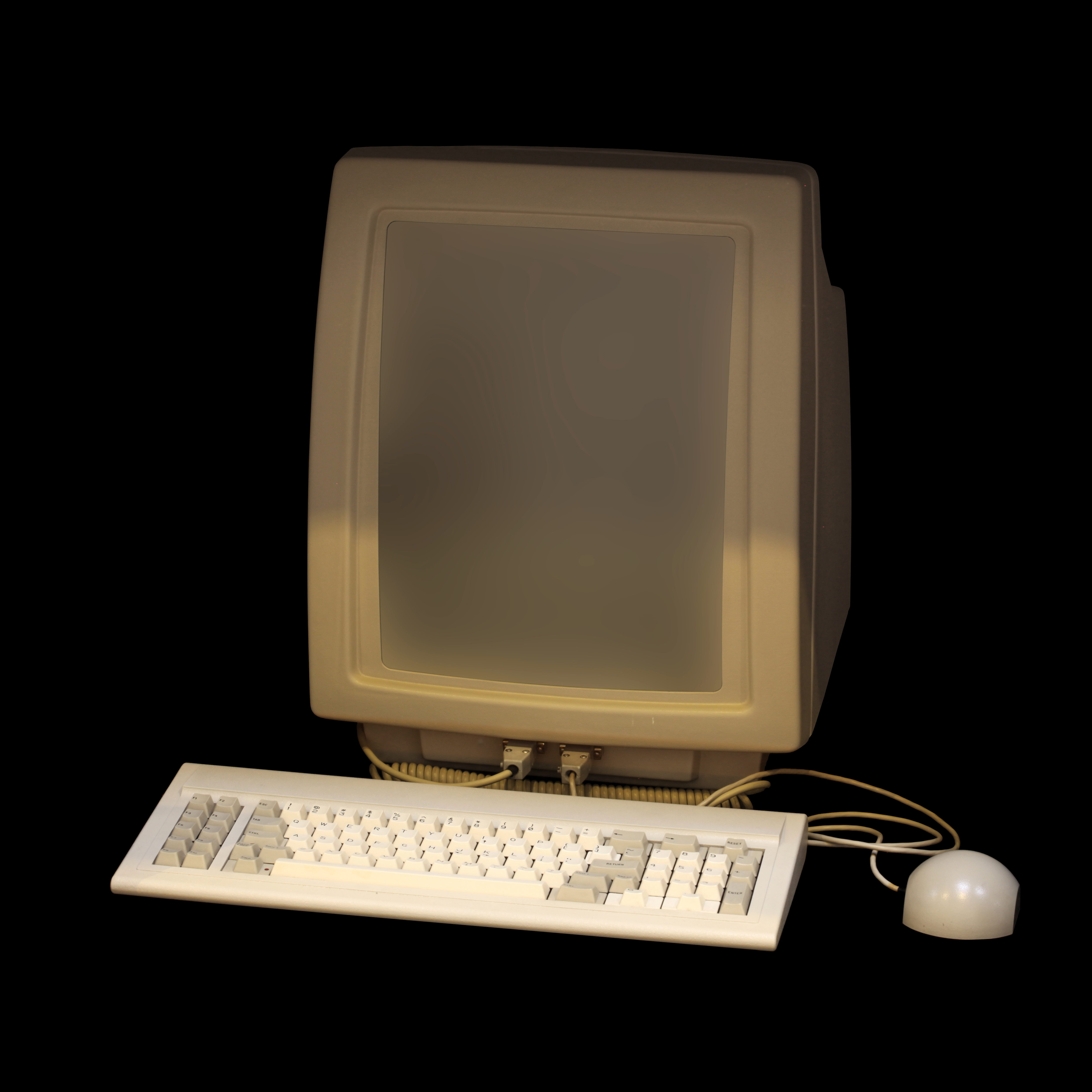
The vertical screen, keyboard and mouse of the Diser Lilith

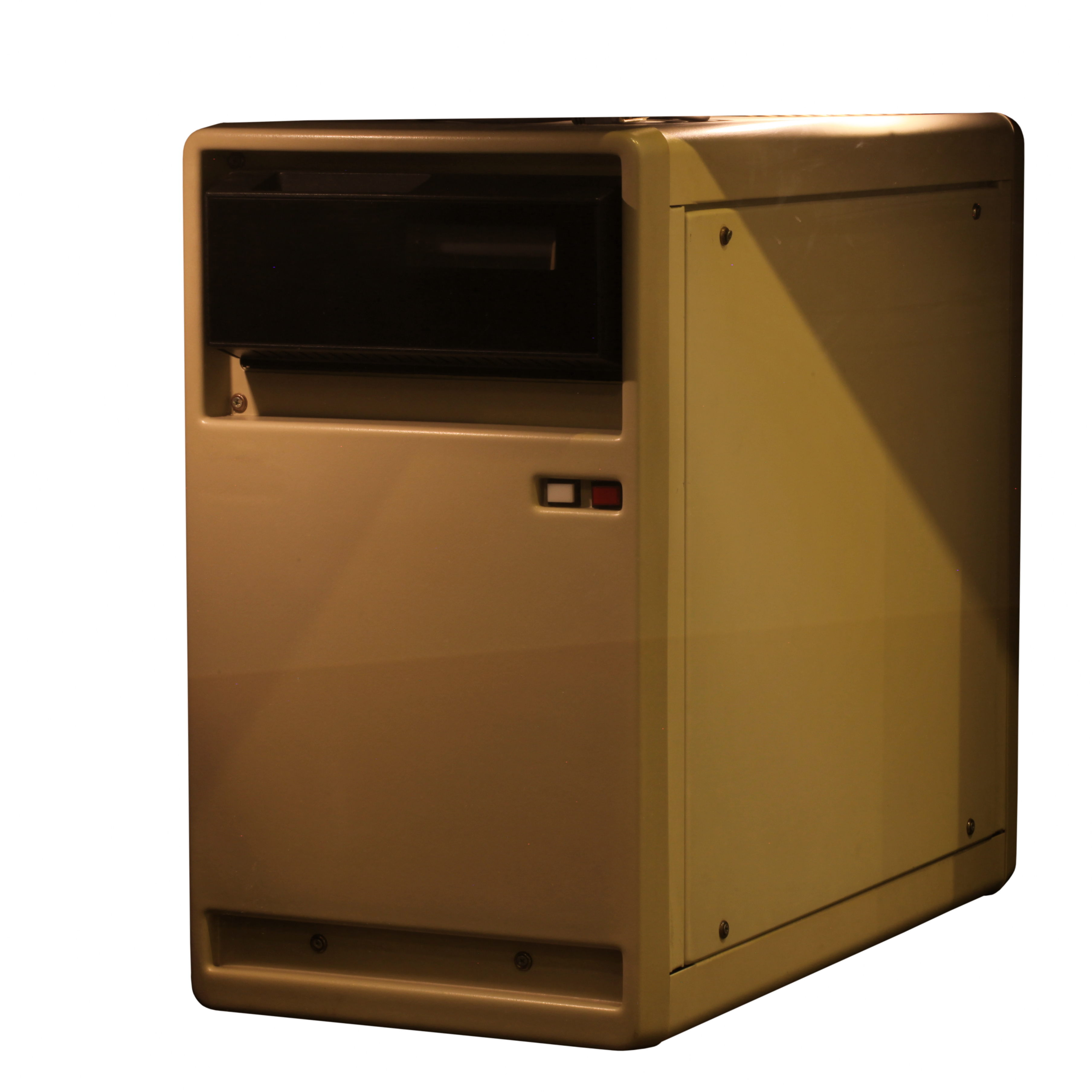
Vertical tower central unit

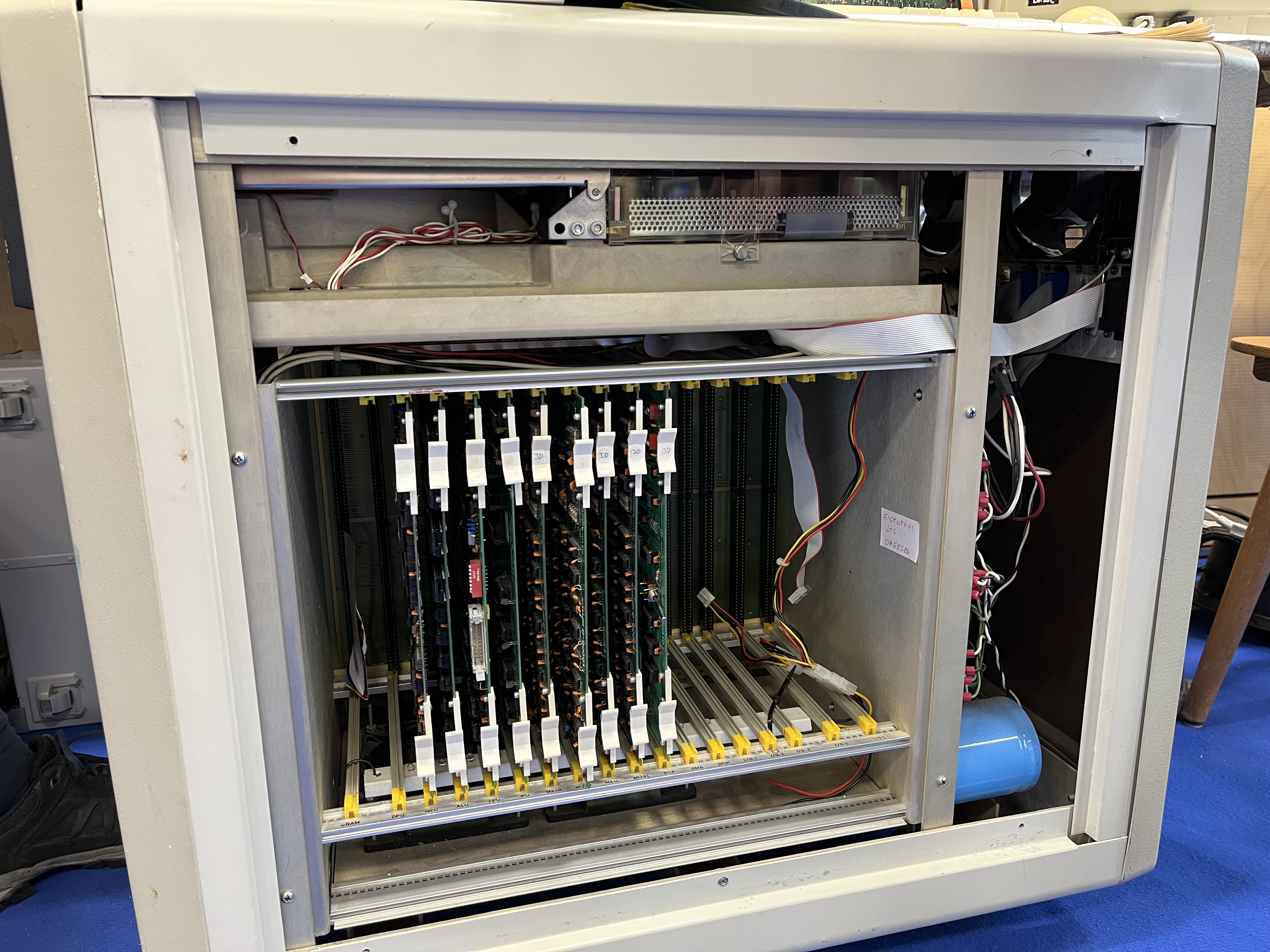
Internal view of the Lilith, showcasing the CPU boards

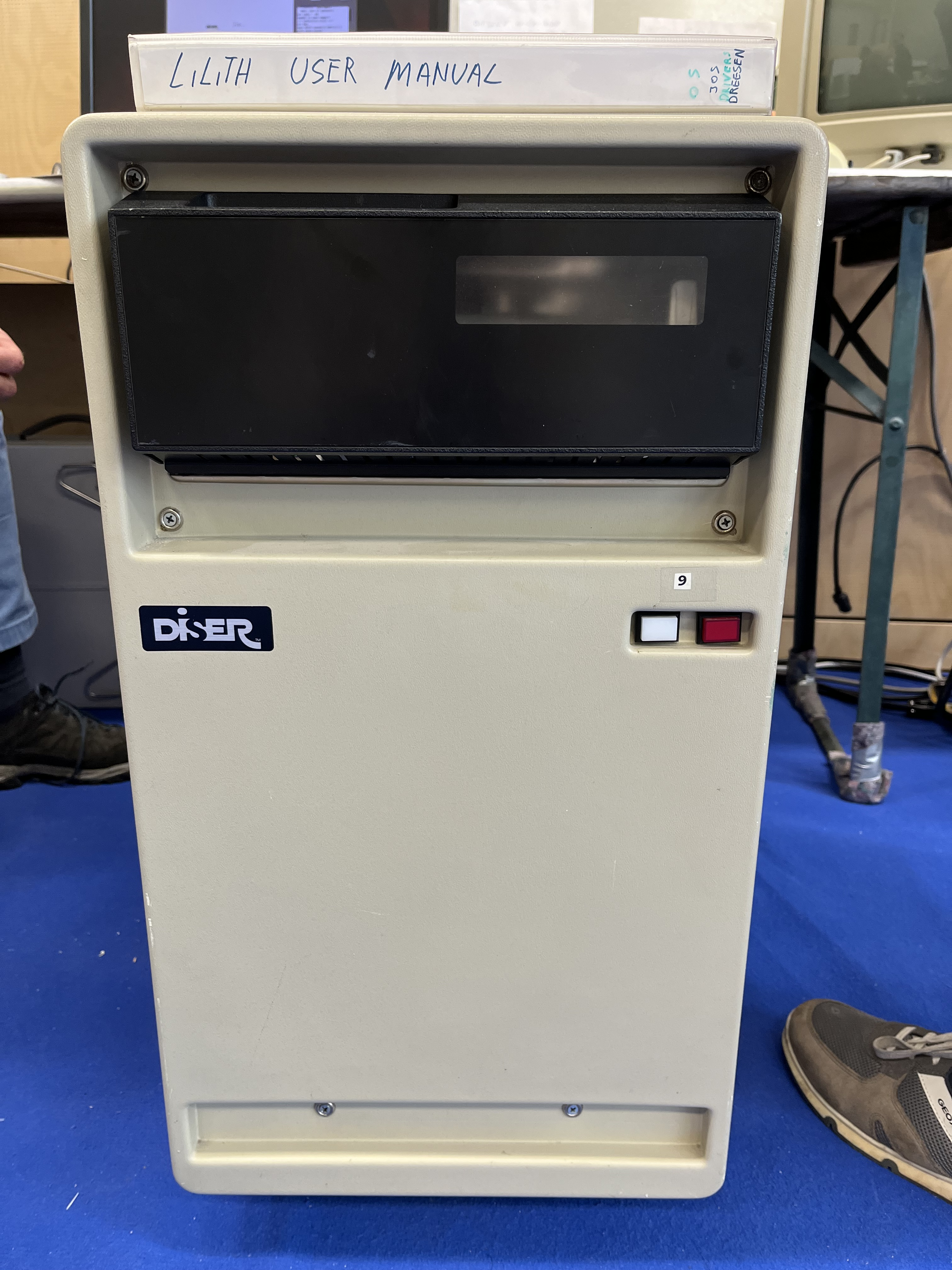
Front view of the Lilith workstation
