= PC532 =

The PC532 was a "home-brew" microcomputer design created by George Scolaro and Dave Rand in 1989-1990, based on the National Semiconductor NS32532 microprocessor (a member of the NS320xx series). Full hardware documentation for the design, including schematics and PAL programming data, was made freely available, and a short run (around 200) of motherboard PCBs were produced for hobbyists to populate and assemble into fully functional systems.

== Hardware specifications ==
- PC/AT form-factor motherboard
- NS32532 CPU and NS32381 FPU (25 MHz)
- 4 to 32 MB of RAM
- National Semiconductor DP8490 SCSI host adapter
- Adaptec AIC-6250 SCSI host adapter
- Four SCN2861 DUARTs (providing 8 serial ports)
- 27256 32 kB firmware EPROM

== Operating systems ==
The following operating systems were ported to the PC532:

MINIX
A port of MINIX 1.3 to the PC532 (sometimes referred to as MINIX-532) was released by Bruce Culbertson in 1990.
Mach
Mach 3.0 was ported to the PC532 in 1992 by Johannes Helander, Tero Kivinen, and Tatu Ylönen; some work was also done by them on porting a Net/2 BSD-based Mach server (bnr2ss) to provide BSD UNIX emulation.
NetBSD/pc532
A project to port 386BSD 0.1 to the PC532, initially called 532BSD, was started by Phil Nelson. This was integrated into the NetBSD project in 1993 and became NetBSD/pc532, with Nelson as the port maintainer. On January 9, 2008, NetBSD/pc532 was dropped from the NetBSD source tree, as GCC support for the NS32532 microprocessor had been dropped.
