= Kronos (computer) =

Mid-1980s Soviet 32-bit graphical workstation

- Developer: Academy of Sciences of the Soviet Union, Siberian branch, Novosibirsk Computing Center, Modular Asynchronous Developable Systems (MARS) project, Kronos Research Group (KRG)
- Product family: Wirth Lilith
- Type: workstation
- Released: 1988; 38 years ago
- Availability: none
- Discontinued: Yes
- Operating system: Excelsior
- CPU: 32-bit
- Display: monochrome bitmapped
- Marketing target: Research
- Website: kronos.ru

Kronos is a series of 32-bit processor equipped printed circuit board systems, and the workstations based thereon, of a proprietary hardware architecture developed in the mid-1980s in Akademgorodok, a research city in Siberia, by the Academy of Sciences of the Soviet Union, Siberian branch, Novosibirsk Computing Center, Modular Asynchronous Developable Systems (MARS) project, Kronos Research Group (KRG).

== History ==
In 1984, the Kronos Research Group (KRG) was founded by four students of the Novosibirsk State University, two from the mathematics department (Dmitry "Leo" Kuznetsov, Alex Nedoria) and two from the physics department (Eugene Tarasov, Vladimir Vasekin). At that time, the main objective was to build home computers for the KRG members.

In 1985, the group joined the Russian fifth generation computer project START, in which Kronos became a platform for developing multiprocessor reconfigurable Modular Asynchronous Developable Systems (MARS), and played a lead role in developing the first Russian full 32-bit workstation and its software.

During 7 years (1984–1991) the group designed and implemented:

- Kronos 2.1 and 2.2 – 32-bit processor boards for DEC LSI-11
- Kronos 2.5 – 32-bit processor board for Labtam computers
- Kronos 2.6 – 32-bit workstation

The project START was finished in 1988. During the post-START years (1988–1991), several Russian industrial organizations expressed interest in continuing the Kronos development and some had been involved in facilitating the construction of Kronos and MARS prototypes, including the design of a Kronos-on-chip. However, changing funding levels and the chaotic economic situation during perestroika kept those plans from being realized.

== Architecture ==
The Kronos instruction set architecture was based on Niklaus Wirth's Modula-2 workstation Lilith, developed at the Swiss Federal Institute of Technology (ETH Zurich) of Zürich Switzerland, which in turn was inspired by the Xerox Alto developed at Xerox PARC.

The Modula-2-based Kronos was quite amenable to the basic principles of MARS, as Modula-2 is fundamentally modular, allowing programs to be partitioned into units with relatively well defined interfaces. These interfaces supported separate compiling of modules, and separating of module specifications from their implementation. The primary difference between Lilith and Kronos was that the processor of Lilith was 16-bit, while Kronos was 32-bit and incorporated several extensions to the instruction set to accommodate the inter-processor communication needed in MARS.

Kronos satisfied many aspects of the reduced instruction set computer (RISC) design, although it was not pure RISC: the evaluation stack was used to evaluate expressions and to hold parameters for procedure calls. Since most executed instructions were encoded in a single byte, the object code for Kronos was very compact. Although Kronos was a proprietary processor, it was well suited to applications which were sensitive to high programmability rather than to software compatibility. For example, embedded control systems require fast and reliable design of new original applications for controlling unique objects and processes. Modula-2 was then a perfect language for this purpose, and Kronos was a perfect processor to effectively run the Modula-2 software.

== Hardware ==
An advanced version of Kronos was based on a 32-bit stack-type КА1845ВМ1 processor, КА1845ВС1 data processing unit, and УУП memory control unit. All the three were designed and fabricated by КНИИМП, Kiev Research Institute of Microdevices.

- КА1845ВМ1 had 246 commands, which allowed supporting Modula-2 language. It also featured hardware support of interrupts and process synchronization. The CPU was fabricated in a 2.5 um CMOS technology with two layers of metallization and packaged in a planar 84-pin metal-polymer case. It contains 199 thousands elements and has area of 8.55x8.1 mm^2. The maximum clock frequency is 10 MHz.
- КА1845ВС1 contained ALU, 8x32 stack, matrix shifter, 16x32 register block, and status flag multiplexers. The amount of addressable memory is 4 GB. The chip area is 5.8x5.25 mm^2, 16 thousand elements.
- УУП provided operation with virtual memory up to 4 GB. It contains a data cache (128x32), a redirect buffer (128x40), a dynamic RAM controller, and an error detection and correction circuit. Memory access time does not exceed 100 ns. УУП chip contains 102 thousands elements and has area of 9.1x7.3 mm^2.

== Software ==
The Kronos software included:

- Versions of the proprietary operating system Excelsior
- Compilers for Modula-2, C, and Fortran
- CAD systems
- Other applications

=== Operating system ===
Excelsior
- Developer: Kronos Research Group (KRG)
- Written in: Modula-2
- Working state: Discontinued
- Source model: proprietary
- Marketing target: Research
- Available in: Russian
- Update method: Compile from source code
- Package manager: Modula-2 modules
- Supported platforms: Kronos
- Kernel type: Modular
- Preceded by: Medos-2
- Official website: www.kronos.ru/literature/processors

The Kronos workstation includes an operating system named Excelsior, developed by the Kronos Research Group (KRG). It is a single user system based on Modula-2 modules.

In design, it is similar to the OS Medos-2, developed for the Lilith workstation, at ETH Zurich, by Svend Erik Knudsen with advice from Niklaus Wirth.
