= Modula =

Programming language

- Paradigms: Imperative, structured, modular
- Family: Wirth Modula
- Designed by: Niklaus Wirth
- Developer: Niklaus Wirth
- First appeared: 1975; 51 years ago
- Typing discipline: Static, strong, safe
- Scope: Lexical
- Platform: PDP-11, LSI-11

Influenced by
- Pascal

Influenced
- Alma-0, Go, Modula-2

The Modula programming language is a descendant of the Pascal language. It was developed in Switzerland, at ETH Zurich, in the mid-1970s by Niklaus Wirth, the same person who designed Pascal. The main innovation of Modula over Pascal is a module system, used for grouping sets of related declarations into program units; hence the name Modula. The language is defined in a report by Wirth called Modula. A language for modular multiprogramming published 1976.

Modula was first implemented by Wirth on a PDP-11. Very soon, other implementations followed, most importantly, the compilers developed for University of York Modula, and one at Philips Laboratories named PL Modula, which generated code for the LSI-11 microprocessor.

The development of Modula was discontinued soon after its publication. Wirth then concentrated his efforts on Modula's successor, Modula-2.

== See also ==
- Modula-2
- Modula-2+
- Modula-3
