= Niklaus Wirth =

Swiss computer scientist (1934–2024)

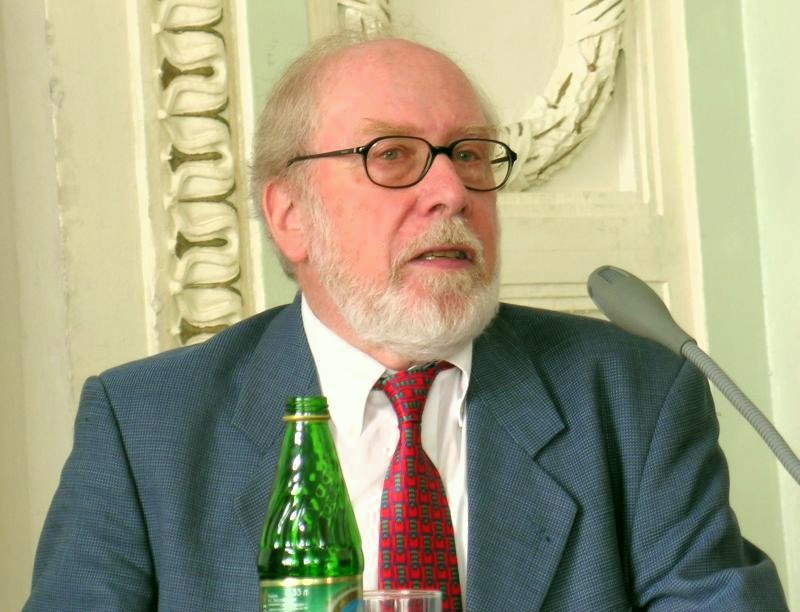
- Wirth in 2005
- Born: Niklaus Emil Wirth; 15 February 1934; Winterthur, Switzerland
- Died: 1 January 2024 (aged 89); Zürich, Switzerland
- Education: ETH Zurich (Dipl. El.-Ing.); Laval University (MSc); UC Berkeley (PhD)
- Known for: Euler; ALGOL W; Pascal; Modula-2; Oberon; Oberon System; Lilith; Ceres; Stepwise refinement; Wirth's law
- Spouses: Nani Jucker (m. 1959); Diana Pschorr
- Children: 3
- Awards: IEEE Emanuel R. Piore Award (1983); Turing Award (1984); Marcel Benoist Prize (1989); Pour le Mérite for Sciences and Arts (1995); Fellow of the Computer History Museum (2004); SIGPLAN Programming Languages Achievement Award (2007)
- Scientific career
- Fields: Computer science
- Workplaces: Stanford University; University of Zurich; ETH Zurich; Xerox PARC
- Thesis: A Generalization of Algol (1963)
- Doctoral advisor: Harry Huskey; Edward Feigenbaum
- Doctoral students: Martin Odersky; Michael Franz

Niklaus Emil Wirth (IPA: /vɛrt/) (15 February 1934 – 1 January 2024) was a Swiss computer scientist. He designed a series of programming languages, among them Pascal, Modula-2 and Oberon, and he led the construction of the Lilith and Ceres workstations at ETH Zurich. In 1984 he received the Turing Award, generally recognized as the highest distinction in computer science, "for developing a sequence of innovative computer languages".

Wirth studied electrical engineering at ETH Zurich and completed his doctorate at the University of California, Berkeley, in 1963. He taught at Stanford University until 1967, and was a professor at ETH Zurich from 1968 until he retired in 1999. At ETH he helped to establish computer science as a separate field of study, and he twice headed its Department of Computer Science. Pascal became a standard language for teaching programming around the world, and his paper "Program Development by Stepwise Refinement" (1971) and his book Algorithms + Data Structures = Programs (1976) became classic texts.

Throughout his career Wirth argued that software and hardware should be as simple as possible. He built the systems that he taught, often with small teams, and he criticized the size and complexity of commercial software. His essay "A Plea for Lean Software" (1995) popularized the adage now known as Wirth's law.

== Early life and education ==
Niklaus Emil Wirth was born in Winterthur, Switzerland, on 15 February 1934. He was the son of Hedwig (née Keller) and Walter Wirth, who taught geography at the gymnasium in Winterthur.

Wirth studied electrical engineering at ETH Zurich from 1954 and received his diploma as an electrical engineer in 1958. He then spent a year as a teaching assistant at Université Laval in Quebec, which awarded him a Master of Science in 1960. After four months at the National Research Council in Ottawa, where he built a small analogue computer, he moved to California.

At the University of California, Berkeley, Wirth came across a group of graduate students who had written a compiler for NELIAC, a dialect of ALGOL 58, in the language itself. He found their program "hardly intelligible", wrote a small ALGOL 60 compiler of his own, and decided to bring order into the subject in his thesis. His doctoral thesis, A Generalization of ALGOL, was supervised by Harry Huskey, and he received his PhD in 1963.

== Career ==
=== Stanford (1963–1967) ===
From 1963 to 1967 Wirth was an assistant professor in the newly founded Department of Computer Science at Stanford University. He joined IFIP Working Group 2.1, which was preparing a successor to ALGOL 60, and the group asked him to draft a proposal. At the meeting where he presented it, Adriaan van Wijngaarden presented a more ambitious competing proposal, which developed into ALGOL 68. Wirth returned to Stanford and implemented his own proposal with a group of graduate students. It became known as ALGOL W. To write its compiler he designed PL360, a language close to machine code. He left the working group soon afterwards. ETH's staff magazine later described his next language, Pascal, as the work of one person who wanted, for once, to follow his own ideas without the compromises of a committee.

=== Zurich (1967–1976) ===
In 1967 Wirth returned to Switzerland as an assistant professor at the University of Zurich. In 1968 he became professor of computer science at ETH Zurich, at first in a joint appointment with the University of Zurich. Together with Heinz Rutishauser and Peter Läuchli he formed a computer science group (Fachgruppe Computer-Wissenschaften), which separated from ETH's Institute of Applied Mathematics.

At ETH Wirth designed Pascal. Its report was published in 1970, and from 1972 he used the language to teach introductory programming to classes of about 300 students. To help other universities adopt Pascal, his group distributed a compiler that produced p-code for a hypothetical computer. A university then had to write only a small interpreter for its own machine.

=== Xerox PARC and Lilith (1976–1984) ===
In 1976–1977 Wirth spent a sabbatical year at Xerox PARC, which Butler Lampson had helped to arrange. There he worked with the Xerox Alto, an early workstation with a graphical user interface and a mouse, and he decided to build a similar computer at ETH. With Richard Ohran, who had taught hardware design in Utah, and a few graduate students, he designed the Lilith workstation, which was completed in 1979. For Lilith he designed Modula-2, a smaller language modelled on Xerox's Mesa. A series of 20 Liliths was built in the United States for ETH, at about 20,000 Swiss francs each. A Swiss company that tried to sell the computer was soon wound up, but production continued in the United States, and about 500 Liliths were built in total.

In the 1970s Wirth and his colleague Carl August Zehnder twice proposed a separate degree course in computer science. Both proposals failed. According to Wirth, the main reason was that industry saw no need for such graduates. Around 1979, industry representatives complained to the federal government about a shortage of programmers. ETH then set up a Department of Computer Science. Its first students enrolled in autumn 1981, and it was the first new department at ETH since 1935. Wirth headed the department from 1982 to 1984 and from 1988 to 1990. He later said that, had he known how slow it would be to establish computer science in Switzerland, he would probably have stayed in the United States.

=== Oberon and Ceres (1984–1999) ===
Wirth spent a second sabbatical at Xerox PARC in 1984–1985, and he received the Turing Award during this stay. At PARC he found the language Cedar "unnecessarily complicated", and he decided to create a language that concentrated on the essentials. In 1985 he and Jürg Gutknecht began to develop an operating system for workstations, which they named Oberon. Wirth extended Modula-2 with type extension, which allowed an object-oriented style of programming, and at the same time made the language smaller. The new language was also named Oberon. Wirth and Gutknecht wrote the system themselves in about three years.

Oberon ran on Ceres, a series of workstations that ETH built from 1984 on around commercial microprocessors. Its chief architect was Hans Eberle. About 80 Ceres-1 and Ceres-2 machines were built for ETH. In 1990 Wirth and his doctoral student Beat Heeb built the Ceres-3, of which 100 were made for the department's student laboratories at less than 5,000 Swiss francs each. From 1988 Oberon was the standard language for programming courses in ETH's computer science department. From 1989 the system was ported to MS-DOS, Microsoft Windows, the Macintosh, and workstations from IBM, Sun, Digital Equipment and Hewlett-Packard. It was available free of charge over the network. Wirth said that he had developed Oberon mainly for teaching, not for commercial use.

From 1990 Wirth headed the Institute for Computer Systems at ETH, which he had founded. In the 1990s he turned to field-programmable gate arrays. With Heeb he built the reconfigurable computer Chamäleon (1990), and in 1991 he published the hardware description language Lola. He also designed the on-board computer for an autonomous model helicopter that students in mechanical engineering had built. He retired in 1999. His farewell lecture, "Erfindungen der Informatik" ("Inventions of computer science"), was printed in shortened form in the Neue Zürcher Zeitung.

=== Retirement (1999–2024) ===
In retirement Wirth prepared a new edition of Project Oberon, his book with Gutknecht on the Oberon system. The processor that the first edition described no longer existed, so he designed his own processor, RISC5, and implemented it on a Xilinx field-programmable gate array board. The new edition appeared in 2013, and the complete system was published as open source.

== Programming languages ==
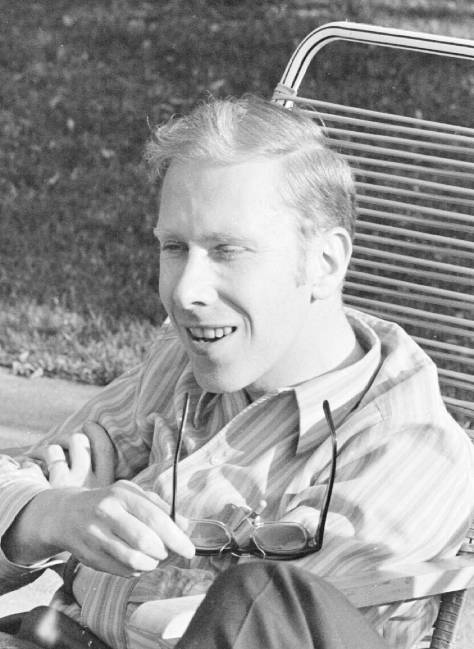
Wirth in 1969

Wirth was the chief designer of the programming languages Euler (1965), PL360 (1966), ALGOL W (1966), Pascal (1970), Modula (1975), Modula-2 (1978), Oberon (1988), Oberon-2 (1991), and Oberon-07 (2007). He was also a major part of the design and implementation team for the operating systems Medos-2 (1983, for the Lilith workstation) and Oberon (1987, for the Ceres workstation). For digital hardware he created the Lola design and simulation system, which he described in his textbook Digital Circuit Design (1995).

== Views on software design ==
Wirth worked by a maxim attributed to Albert Einstein: "as simple as possible, but not simpler". He held that a first programming language should be small and clean and should concentrate on the essential concepts. He objected that commercial languages had become so large that nobody could understand them completely. In a 1999 interview he said that his greatest satisfaction in programming came when he managed to leave parts out, and he called the industry practice of measuring programmers by lines of code per day "nonsense".

He was critical of the software industry and of Swiss attitudes to research. In 1991 he said that many of his ideas were accepted in Switzerland only after others had brought them back from the United States. In an interview shortly before the release of Windows 95, he argued for a more thorough education in computer science, which would also produce more competent customers. In his farewell lecture of 1999 he called the enthusiasm for innovation exaggerated. Computer science, he said, suffered from "chronic innovationitis" and needed more attention to reliability, clarity and solidity.

=== Wirth's law ===
In "A Plea for Lean Software" (1995), Wirth attributed to Martin Reiser the observation that "software is getting slower more rapidly than hardware becomes faster". The adage became known as Wirth's law.

== Legacy ==
Pascal became a widely used language for teaching programming. Its p-code compiler made it easy to move the language to new computers, and Bertrand Meyer called p-code "the ancestor of today's virtual machines". Because the compiler fitted into a small memory, Pascal also suited the microcomputers that spread from the mid-1970s. Borland's Turbo Pascal brought the language its commercial breakthrough. According to Wirth, Borland sold the whole system on one diskette for about $50, when compilers for mainframes cost $10,000 or more. Delphi, a later Pascal-based product, was still on sale when he died.

Oberon led to further languages, among them Oberon-2, Oberon-07 and Component Pascal. The designers of Go name the "Pascal/Modula/Oberon family" as a significant influence on its declarations and packages. Meyer also credited Wirth with showing that compilers "could be built simply and elegantly through recursive descent". Wirth's doctoral students included Martin Odersky, later the designer of Scala, and Michael Franz. In 2000 former students and colleagues published a collection of essays in his honour, The School of Niklaus Wirth: The Art of Simplicity.

After his death, Meyer wrote that he could "think of only a handful of people who have shaped the global hardware and software industry in a comparable way". In The Register, Liam Proven judged that Wirth's influence on the computer industry "has been almost beyond measure", but that the modern software industry "has signally failed to learn from him".

== Honours and awards ==
Wirth received honorary doctorates from the University of York and the École polytechnique fédérale de Lausanne in 1978, the first of twelve. His other honours include:

- IEEE Emanuel R. Piore Award (1983)
- Turing Award (1984) "for developing a sequence of innovative computer languages"
- ACM SIGCSE Award for Outstanding Contributions to Computer Science Education (1987)
- Computer Pioneer Award of the IEEE Computer Society
- Marcel Benoist Prize (1989)
- Foreign associate of the National Academy of Engineering (1993)
- Fellow of the Association for Computing Machinery (1994)
- Member of the Pour le Mérite for Sciences and Arts (1995)
- ACM SIGSOFT Outstanding Research Award (1999)
- International Honorary Member of the American Academy of Arts and Sciences (2003)
- Fellow of the Computer History Museum (2004) "for seminal work in programming languages and algorithms, including Euler, Algol-W, Pascal, Modula, and Oberon"
- ACM SIGPLAN Programming Languages Achievement Award (2007)

== Publications ==
The April 1971 Communications of the ACM article "Program Development by Stepwise Refinement", on the teaching of programming, is considered a classic text in software engineering. It is regarded as the earliest work to formally describe the top-down method of designing programs. Fred Brooks discussed the article in The Mythical Man-Month, and the ACM's biography of Wirth, published with his Turing Award, called it "seminal".

The textbook Systematic Programming: An Introduction appeared in German in 1972 and in English in 1973. According to its cover flap, the book "is tailored to the needs of people who view a course on systematic construction of algorithms as part of their basic mathematical training, rather than to the immediate needs of those who wish to be able to occasionally encode a problem and hand it over to their computer for instant solution". A 1974 review in Mathematics of Computation found the book demanding to work through, but recommended it to mathematicians who wanted to understand the nature of programming and to readers interested in numerical mathematics.

The Pascal User Manual and Report (1974), written with Kathleen Jensen, (Note: The first chapter (the user manual) is a joint work, which according to Jensen was edited by Wirth. The second chapter (the report) is by Wirth, and was also published separately.) served as the basis for many implementations of the language in the United States and Europe in the 1970s and 1980s, such as Berkeley Pascal.

His book Algorithms + Data Structures = Programs appeared in German in 1975 and in English in 1976, and it was widely cited. Revised editions with the new title Algorithms & Data Structures were published in 1986 and 2004. The examples in the first edition were written in Pascal. The later editions replaced them with examples in Modula-2 and Oberon, respectively.

In 1992 Wirth and Gutknecht published the full documentation of the Oberon system as Project Oberon. A companion book with Martin Reiser, Programming in Oberon, was written as a programming guide.

== Personal life and death ==
Wirth married Nani Jucker in 1959, and they had three children. The couple separated in 1980. Wirth later married Diana Pschorr. He was interested in aviation from his youth, built model aircraft, and took flying lessons in the United States. After his retirement he learned Russian, which he could read and write.

Wirth died in Zürich on 1 January 2024, at the age of 89.

== See also ==
- 21655 Niklauswirth asteroid
- Extended Backus–Naur form
- Wirth syntax notation
- Bucky bit
- Wirth–Weber precedence relationship
- List of pioneers in computer science
