= John L. Martin Jr. =

United States Air Force general

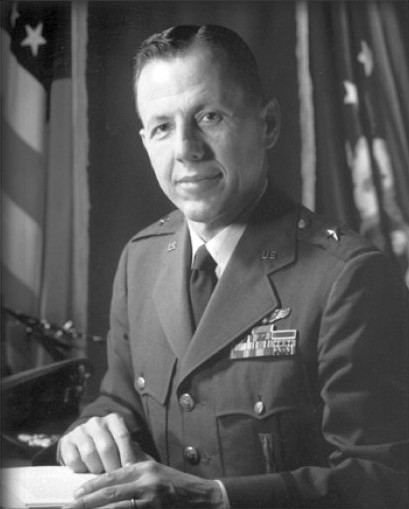
- Born: 18 October 1920; Fairforest, South Carolina, U.S.
- Died: 15 November 2009 (aged 89); San Antonio, Texas, U.S.
- Burial place: Fort Sam Houston National Cemetery, San Antonio, Texas
- Relatives: Abner B. Martin (brother)
- Military career
- Allegiance: United States
- Branch: United States Army (1941–1947); United States Air Force (1947–1970)
- Service years: 1940–1970
- Rank: Major General
- Conflicts: World War II; Korean War
- Awards: Distinguished Service Medal; Legion of Merit (2); Distinguished Flying Cross (2)

John Landrum Martin Jr. (18 October 1920 – 15 November 2009) was a major general in the United States Air Force. He enlisted in the United States Army Air Corps in 1940 and flew combat missions in Boeing B-29 Superfortress bombers in the China-Burma-India Theater.

In 1960, he became deputy director of the Office of Missile and Satellite Systems in the Office of the Secretary of the Air Force. When the office was reorganized, he became the second National Reconnaissance Office (NRO) staff director. In 1964 he moved to El Segundo, California, as vice director and later director of special projects, also known as NRO Program A. He devised and implemented an incentive contract structure for satellite programs that was still in used decades later, and introduced changes to procedures for satellite component and system testing.

After he retired from the USAF in 1970, he became vice president for engineering and operations at the Communications Satellite Corporation (COMSAT) in Washington, D.C., where he oversaw the development and deployment of the Comstar, Marisat and Aerosat communication satellite programs.

== Early life ==
John Landrum Martin Jr. was born on the family farm of his parents, John Landrum Martin Sr. and Blanche Wheeler Martin, in Fairforest, South Carolina, on 18 October 1920. He had a younger brother, Abner Broadwater Martin. From 1937 to 1940, he attended Clemson Agricultural and Mechanical College, where he studied mechanical engineering, and earned a private pilot license.

== World War II ==
In 1940 Martin enlisted in the United States Army Air Corps as a Flying Cadet. On completion of his flight training at Randolph Field in Texas in 1941, he was commissioned as a second lieutenant, but stayed at Randolph Field as an instructor. During a training flight to El Paso, Texas, in 1942, he met Elisabeth (Bettie) Blakemore, and they married after a six-month courtship. They had a daughter Teri, and a son, John Landrum Martin III.

Martin completed additional training on the Consolidated B-24 Liberator four-engine bomber, and then was assigned to the 444th Bombardment Group in April 1943. He represented the group at the factory where the group's new Boeing B-29 Superfortress bomber was being built and tested. In April 1944, the 444th Bombardment Group deployed to the China-Burma-India Theater as part of the 58th Bombardment Wing of the XX Bomber Command. Martin flew 14 combat missions, and made 30 trips across "The Hump" (the Himalayan mountains) ferrying fuel and bombs to a forward air base in China. He returned to Randolph Field in March 1945 as a B-29 training group commander, a position he held for the rest of the war.

== Postwar ==
After the war, Martin served with the 509th Bombardment Group. He earned a Bachelor of Science degree in aeronautical engineering from the Polytechnic Institute of Brooklyn in 1948, followed by a Master of Science degree in aeronautical engineering from the Massachusetts Institute of Technology in 1951. He then became an assistant professor at the Air Force Institute of Technology at Wright-Patterson Air Force Base in Ohio. He served for three years in that post, and then four more starting in 1954 at the Wright Air Development Center as chief of the Flight Control Laboratory.

In July 1958, Martin was assigned to United States Air Force (USAF) Headquarters at The Pentagon in Washington, D.C. In 1960, he became deputy director of the Office of Missile and Satellite Systems in the Office of the Secretary of the Air Force. When the office was reorganized, he became the second National Reconnaissance Office (NRO) staff director on 14 June 1964. He was promoted to brigadier general in 1963. In August 1964 he moved to El Segundo, California, as vice director of special projects, also known as NRO Program A. He became director of Program A on 1 July 1965, with the rank of major general, concurrently serving as deputy commander for satellite programs in the Space Systems Division of the Air Force Systems Command. He devised and implemented an incentive contract structure for satellite programs that was still in use decades later, and introduced changes to procedures for satellite component and system testing.

== Later life ==
After Martin retired from the USAF in 1970, he worked for Communications Satellite Corporation (COMSAT) in Washington, D.C., as its vice president for engineering and operations. In this role he oversaw the development and deployment of the Comstar, Marisat and Aerosat communication satellite programs. He retired again in 1981. In retirement he returned to San Antonio, where he built an experimental aeroplane based on a design by Burt Rutan. His decorations included the Army Distinguished Service Medal, the Legion of Merit with one oak leaf cluster, the Distinguished Flying Cross with one oak leaf cluster, and the Air Medal with two oak leaf clusters.

He died in San Antonio on 15 November 2009, and was buried in Fort Sam Houston National Cemetery in San Antonio. He was survived by his children and brother Abner. His wife died in 2008.
