= Comsat =

Comsat(s) may refer to:

== Technology ==
- Communications satellite
- COMSAT (Communications Satellite Corporation)
- COMSAT mobile communications, a telecommunications company, formerly a business unit of Communications Satellite Corporation
- Commission on Science and Technology for Sustainable Development in the South (COMSATS), an inter-governmental organization
- COMSATS University, a university in Pakistan
- The name of the associated daemon for the biff mail notification system.

== See also ==
- Comcast, a global telecommunications conglomerate, owns Xfinity and NBCUniversal
- The Comsat Angels, an English post-punk band
