= General Wells =

General Wells may refer to:

- Briant H. Wells (1871–1949), U.S. Army major general
- Henry Wells (general) (1898–1973), Australian Army lieutenant general
- Richard M. Wells (born 1929), U.S. Army major general
- William Wells (general) (1837–1892), Union Army brigadier general and brevet major general
- Daniel H. Wells (1814–1891), U.S. commander of the Utah Territorial Militia.

== See also ==
- Attorney General Wells (disambiguation)
