= History of software =

Software is a set of programmed instructions to be executed by computers. The term was coined to differentiate these instructions from hardware —i.e., the physical components of a computer system. Software is a recent development in human history and is fundamental to the Information Age.

The first published use of the term "software" in a computing context is often credited to American statistician John W. TukeyOffsite Link, who published the term in "The Teaching of Concrete Mathematics," American Mathematical MonthlyOffsite Link, January 9, 1958. Tukey wrote: "Today the 'software' comprising the carefully planned interpretive routines, compilers, and other aspects of automative programming are at least as important to the modern electronic calculator as its 'hardware' of tubes, transistors, wires, tapes and the like".

Ada Lovelace's programs for Charles Babbage's analytical engine in the 19th century are often considered the founder of the discipline. However, the mathematician's efforts remained theoretical only, as the technology of Lovelace and Babbage's day proved insufficient to build his computer. Alan Turing is credited with being the first person to come up with a theory for software in 1935, which led to the two academic fields of computer science and software engineering.

The first generation of software for early stored-program digital computers in the late 1940s had its instructions written directly in binary code, generally for mainframe computers. Later, the development of modern programming languages alongside the advancement of the home computer would greatly widen the scope and breadth of available software, beginning with assembly language, and continuing through functional programming and object-oriented programming paradigms.

== Before stored-program digital computers ==
=== Origins of computer science ===
Computing as a concept goes back to ancient times, with devices such as the abacus, the Antikythera mechanism, astrolabes, mechanical astronomical clocks and mechanical calculators. The Antikythera mechanism is an example for a highly complex ancient mechanical astronomical device.

However, these devices were pure hardware and had no software - their computing powers were directly tied to their specific form and engineering.

Software requires the concept of a general-purpose processor - what is now described as a Turing machine - as well as computer memory in which reusable sets of routines and mathematical functions comprising programs can be stored, started, and stopped individually, and only appears recently in human history.

The first known computer algorithm was written by Ada Lovelace in the 19th century for the analytical engine, to translate Luigi Menabrea's work on Bernoulli numbers for machine instruction. However, this remained theoretical only - the lesser state of engineering in the lifetime of these two mathematicians proved insufficient to construct the analytical engine.

The first modern theory of software was proposed by Alan Turing in his 1935 essay Computable numbers with an application to the Entscheidungsproblem (decision problem).

This eventually led to the creation of the twin academic fields of computer science and software engineering, which both study software and its creation. Computer science is more theoretical (Turing's essay is an example of computer science), whereas software engineering is focused on more practical concerns.

However, prior to 1946, software as we now understand it – programs stored in the memory of stored-program digital computers – did not yet exist. The very first electronic computing devices were instead rewired in order to "reprogram" them. The ENIAC, one of the first electronic computers, was programmed largely by women who had been previously working as human computers. Engineers would give the programmers blueprints of the ENIAC wiring and expected them to figure out how to program the machine. The women who worked as programmers prepped the ENIAC for its first public reveal, wiring the patch panels together for the demonstrations. Kathleen Booth developed assembly language in 1950 to make it easier to program the computers she worked on at Birkbeck College.

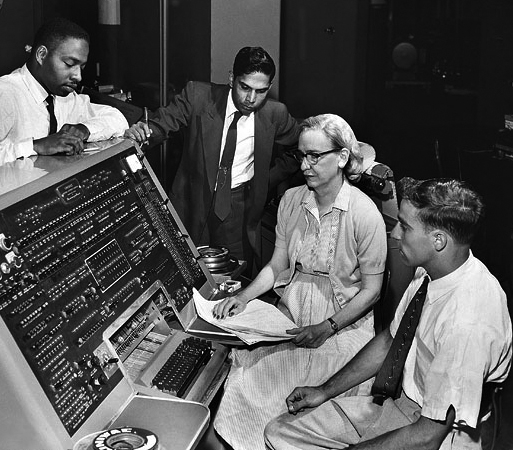
Grace Hopper and UNIVAC

Grace Hopper worked as one of the first programmers of the Harvard Mark I. She later created a 500-page manual for the computer. Hopper is often falsely credited with coining the terms "bug" and "debugging", when she found a moth in the Mark II, causing a malfunction; however, the term was in fact already in use when she found the moth. Hopper developed the first compiler and brought her idea from working on the Mark computers to working on UNIVAC in the 1950s. Hopper also developed the programming language FLOW-MATIC to program the UNIVAC. Frances E. Holberton, also working at UNIVAC, developed a code, C-10, which let programmers use keyboard inputs and created the Sort-Merge Generator in 1951. Adele Mildred Koss and Hopper also created the precursor to a report generator.

== Early days of computer software (1948–1979) ==
In his manuscript "A Mathematical Theory of Communication", Claude Shannon (1916–2001) provided an outline for how binary logic could be implemented to program a computer. Subsequently, the first computer programmers used binary code to instruct computers to perform various tasks. Nevertheless, the process was very arduous. Computer programmers had to provide long strings of binary code to tell the computer what kind of data it should store. Code and data had to be loaded onto computers using various tedious mechanisms, including flicking switches or punching holes at predefined positions in cards and loading these punched cards into a computer. With such methods, if a mistake was made, the whole program might have to be loaded again from the beginning.

The very first time a stored-program computer held a piece of software in electronic memory and executed it successfully, was 11 am 21 June 1948, at the University of Manchester, on the Manchester Baby computer. It was written by Tom Kilburn, and calculated the highest factor of the integer 2^18 (262,144). Starting with a large trial divisor, it performed a division of 262,144 by repeated subtraction and then checked if the remainder was zero. If not, it decremented the trial divisor by one and repeated the process. Google released a tribute to the Manchester Baby, celebrating it as the "birth of software".

FORTRAN was developed by a team led by John Backus at IBM in the 1950s. The first compiler was released in 1957. The language proved so popular for scientific and technical computing that by 1963 all major manufacturers had implemented or announced FORTRAN for their computers.

COBOL was first conceived of when Mary K. Hawes convened a meeting (which included Grace Hopper) in 1959 to discuss how to create a computer language to be shared between businesses. Hopper's innovation with COBOL was developing a new symbolic way to write programming. Her programming was self-documenting. Betty Holberton helped edit the language which was submitted to the Government Printing Office in 1960. FORMAC was developed by Jean E. Sammet in the 1960s. Her book, Programming Languages: History and Fundamentals (1969), became an influential text.

=== Apollo Mission ===
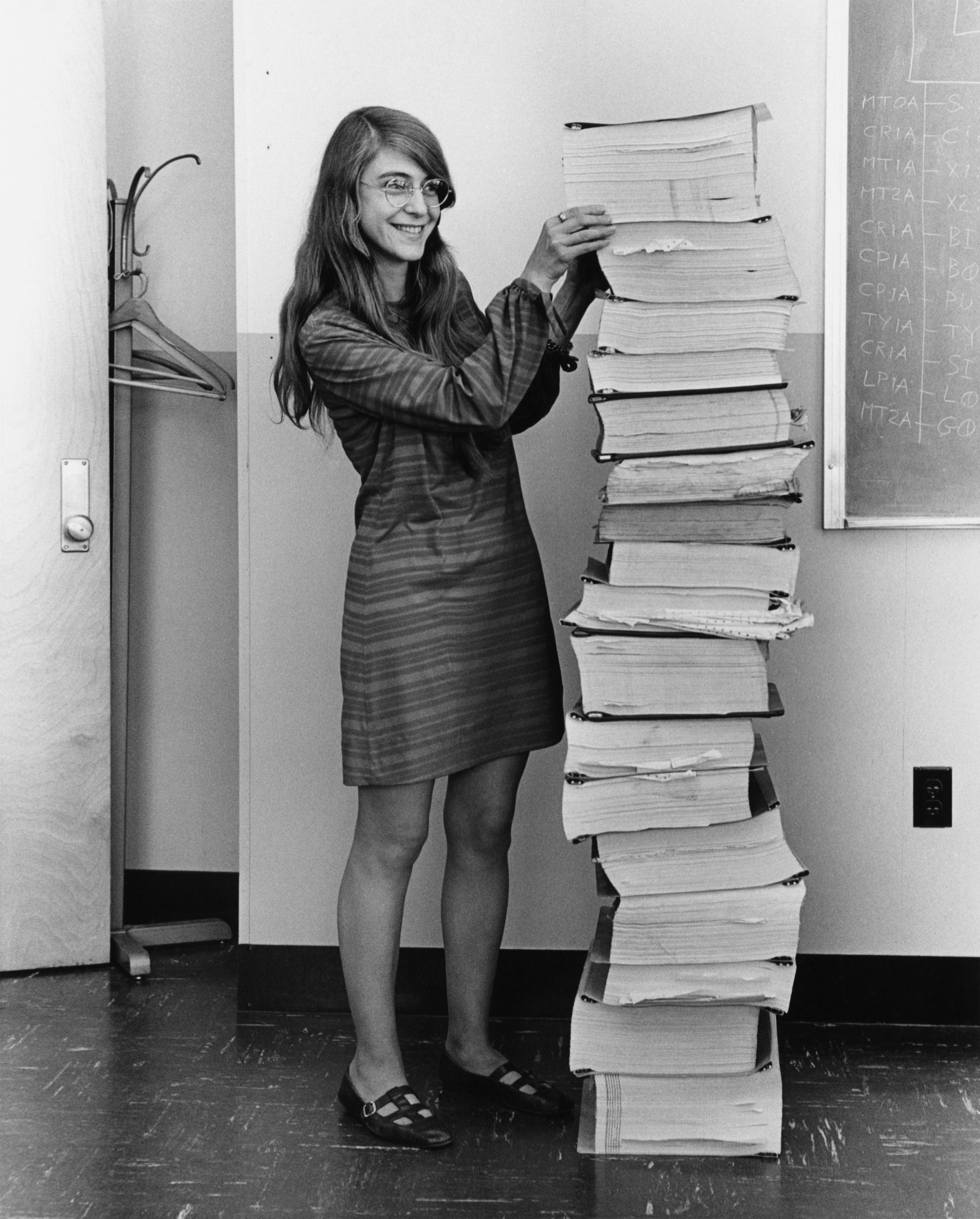
Margaret Hamilton next to a stack output of the code she and her team wrote for the Apollo Mission computers.

The Apollo Mission to the moon depended on software to program the computers in the landing modules. The computers were programmed with a language called "Basic" (no relation to the BASIC programming language developed at Dartmouth at about the same time). The software also had an interpreter which was made up of a series of routines and an executive (like a modern-day operating system), which specified which programs to run and when. Both were designed by Hal Laning. Margaret Hamilton, who had previously been involved with software reliability issues when working on the US SAGE air defense system, was also part of the Apollo software team. Hamilton was in charge of the onboard flight software for the Apollo computers. Hamilton felt that software operations were not just part of the machine, but also intricately involved with the people who operated the software. Hamilton also coined the term "software engineering" while she was working at NASA.

The actual "software" for the computers in the Apollo missions was made up of wires that were threaded through magnetic cores. Where the wire went through a magnetic core, that represented a "1" and where the wire went around the core, that represented a "0." Each core stored 64 bits of information. Hamilton and others would create the software by punching holes in punch cards, which were then later processed on a Honeywell mainframe where the software could be simulated. When the code was "solid," then it was sent to be woven into the magnetic cores at Raytheon, where women known as "Little Old Ladies" worked on the wires. The program itself was "indestructible" and could even withstand lightning strikes, which happened to Apollo 12. Wiring the computers took several weeks to do, freezing software development during that time.

While using the simulators to test the programming, Hamilton discovered ways that code could produce dangerous errors when human mistakes were made while using it. NASA believed that the astronauts would not make mistakes due to their training. Hamilton was not allowed to program code to prevent errors that would lead to system crash, so she annotated the code in the program documentation. Her idea to add error-checking code was rejected as "excessive." However, exactly what Hamilton predicted would happen occurred on the Apollo 8 flight, when human error caused the computer to wipe out all of the navigational data.

=== Bundling of software with hardware and its legal issues ===
Later, software was sold to multiple customers by being bundled with the hardware by original equipment manufacturers (OEMs) such as Data General, Digital Equipment and IBM. When a customer bought a minicomputer, at that time the smallest computer on the market, the computer did not come with pre-installed software, but needed to be installed by engineers employed by the OEM.

This bundling attracted the attention of US antitrust regulators, who sued IBM for improper "tying" in 1969, alleging that it was an antitrust violation that customers who wanted to obtain its software had to also buy or lease its hardware in order to do so. However, the case was dropped by the US Justice Department, after many years of attrition, as it concluded it was "without merit".

Data General also encountered legal problems related to bundling – although in this case, it was due to a civil suit from a would-be competitor. When Data General introduced the Data General Nova, a company called Digidyne wanted to use its RDOS operating system on its own hardware clone. Data General refused to license their software and claimed their "bundling rights". The US Supreme Court set a precedent called Digidyne v. Data General in 1985 by letting a 9th circuit appeal court decision on the case stand, and Data General was eventually forced into licensing the operating system because it was ruled that restricting the license to only DG hardware was an illegal tying arrangement. Even though the District Court noted that "no reasonable juror could find that within this large and dynamic market with much larger competitors", Data General "had the market power to restrain trade through an illegal tie-in arrangement", the tying of the operating system to the hardware was ruled as per se illegal on appeal.

In 2008, Psystar Corporation was sued by Apple Inc. for distributing unauthorized Macintosh clones with OS X preinstalled, and countersued. One of the arguments in the countersuit - citing the Data General case - was that Apple dominates the market for OS X compatible computers by illegally tying the operating system to Apple computers. District Court Judge William Alsup rejected this argument, saying, as the District Court had ruled in the Data General case over 20 years prior, that the relevant market was not simply one operating system (Mac OS) but all PC operating systems, including Mac OS, and noting that Mac OS did not enjoy a dominant position in that broader market. Alsup's judgement also noted that the surprising Data General precedent that tying of copyrighted products was always illegal had since been "implicitly overruled" by the verdict in the Illinois Tool Works Inc. v. Independent Ink, Inc. case.

=== Packaged software (Late 1960s-present) ===
An industry producing independently packaged software - software that was neither produced as a "one-off" for an individual customer, nor "bundled" with computer hardware - started to develop in the late 1960s.

=== Unix (1970s–present) ===
Unix was an early operating system which became popular and very influential, and still exists today. The most popular variant of Unix today is macOS (previously called OS X and Mac OS X), while Linux is closely related to Unix.

=== The rise of Microcomputers ===
In January 1975, Micro Instrumentation and Telemetry Systems began selling its Altair 8800 microcomputer kit by mail order. Microsoft released its first product Altair BASIC later that year, and hobbyists began developing programs to run on these kits. Tiny BASIC was published as a type-in program in Dr. Dobb's Journal, and developed collaboratively.

In 1976, Peter R. Jennings for instance created his Microchess program for MOS Technology's KIM-1 kit, but since it did not come with a tape drive, he would send the source code in a little booklet to his mail-order customers, and they would have to type the whole program in by hand. In 1978, Kathe and Dan Spracklen released the source of their Sargon (chess) program in a computer magazine. Jennings later switched to selling paper tape, and eventually compact cassettes with the program on it.

It was an inconvenient and slow process to type in source code from a computer magazine, and a single mistyped – or worse, misprinted – character could render the program inoperable, yet people still did so. (Optical character recognition technology, which could theoretically have been used to scan in the listings rather than transcribe them by hand, was not yet in wide use.)

Even with the spread of cartridges and cassette tapes in the 1980s for distribution of commercial software, free programs (such as simple educational programs for the purpose of teaching programming techniques) were still often printed, because it was cheaper than making and attaching cassette tapes to magazines.

However, eventually a combination of four factors brought this practice of printing complete source code listings of entire programs in computer magazines to an end:

- programs started to become very large
- floppy discs started to be used for distributing software, and then came down in price
- regular people started to use computers – and wanted a simple way to run a program
- computer magazines started to include cassette tapes or floppy discs with free or trial versions of software on them

Very quickly, commercial software started to be pirated, and commercial software producers were very unhappy at this. Bill Gates, cofounder of Microsoft, was an early moraliser against software piracy with his famous Open Letter to Hobbyists in 1976.

== 1980s–present ==
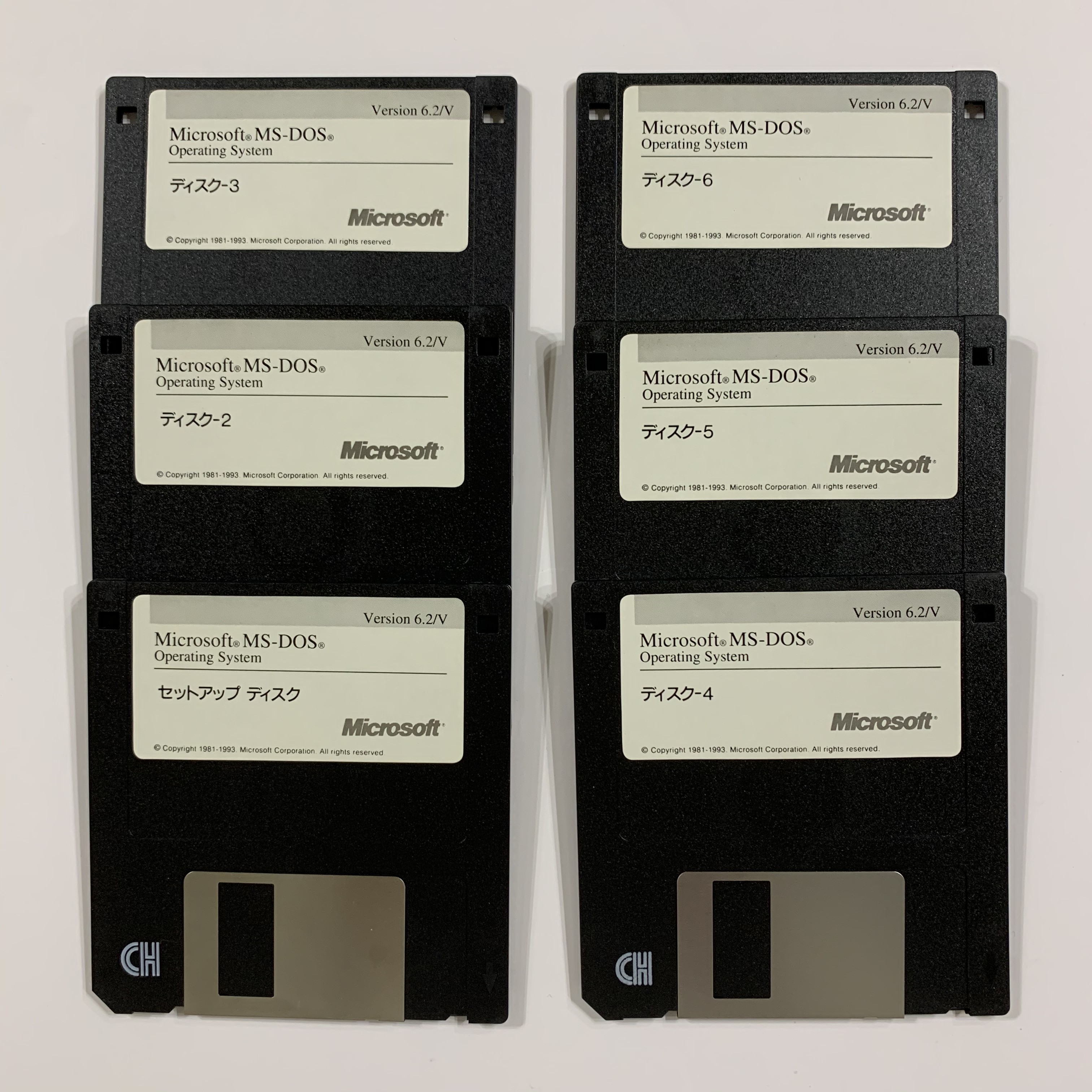
MS-DOS 6.2V floppy disks, 1993

Before the microcomputer, a successful software program typically sold up to 1,000 units at $50,000–60,000 each. By the mid-1980s, personal computer software sold thousands of copies for $50–700 each. Companies like Microsoft, MicroPro, and Lotus Development had tens of millions of dollars in annual sales. They similarly dominated the European market with localized versions of already successful products. Average spending per company on PC software almost tripled from 1989 to 1991, while mainframe software spending did not change.

A pivotal moment in computing history was the publication in the 1980s of the specifications for the IBM Personal Computer published by IBM employee Philip Don Estridge, which quickly led to the dominance of the PC in the worldwide desktop and later laptop markets – a dominance which continues to this day. Microsoft, by successfully negotiating with IBM to develop the first operating system for the PC (MS-DOS), profited enormously from the PC's success over the following decades, via the success of MS-DOS and its add-on-cum-successor, Microsoft Windows. Winning the negotiation was a pivotal moment in Microsoft's history.

=== Free and open source software ===
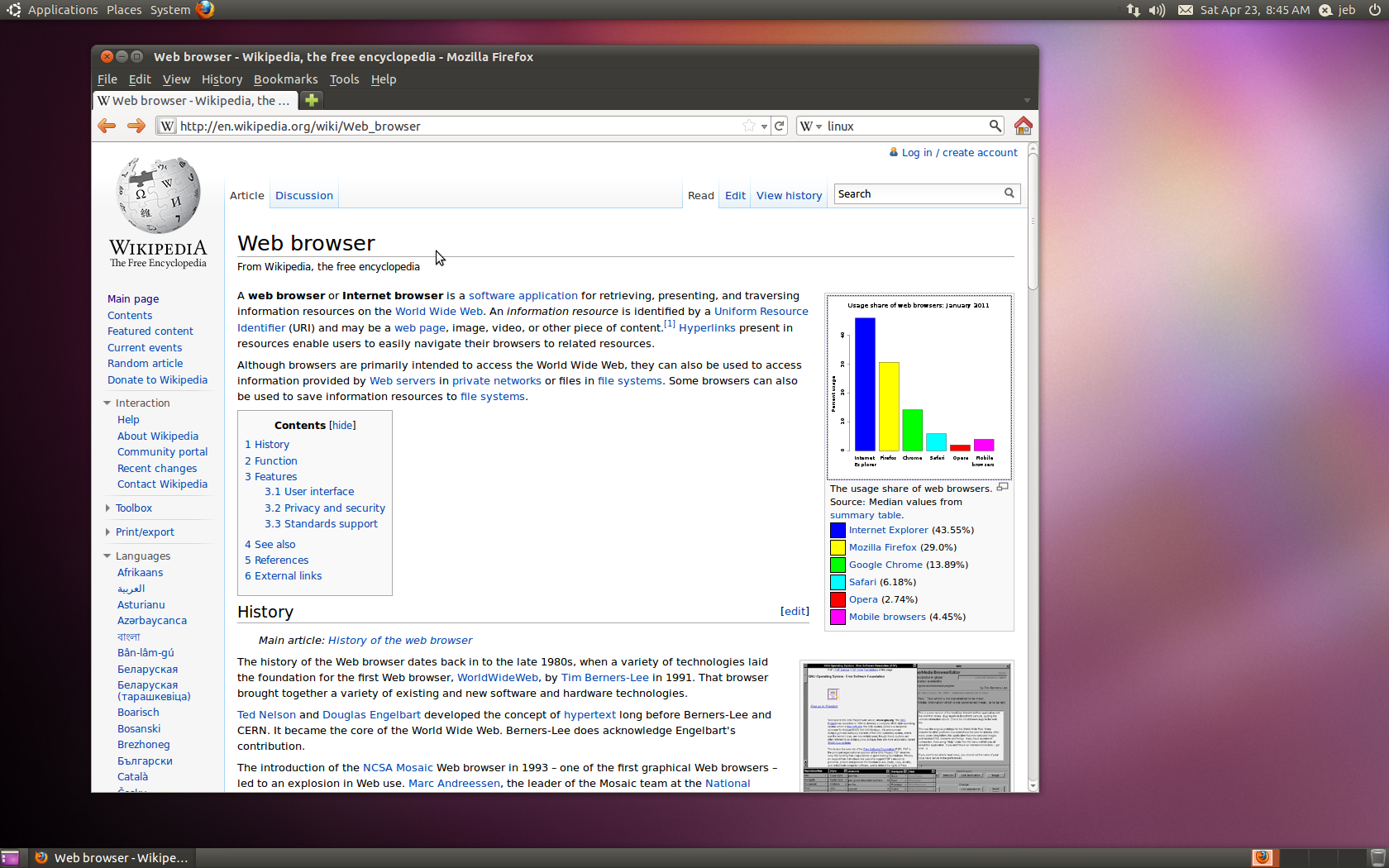
Mozilla Firefox 4 running on Ubuntu Linux, 2011

Free and Open Source Software (FOSS) refers to software that is both freely available for use and distributed under licenses that grant users the freedom to access, modify, and share the software's source code. This approach contrasts with proprietary software, where the source code is typically closed and usage is restricted by licensing agreements. FOSS promotes collaboration and transparency, enabling developers and users worldwide to contribute to the software's improvement, tailor it to their needs, and share enhancements without legal or financial barriers. Popular examples of FOSS include operating systems like Linux, web browsers like Mozilla Firefox, and programming languages like Python. The philosophy behind FOSS not only drives technological innovation but also fosters a global community committed to creating accessible and adaptable software for diverse needs.

=== Recent developments ===
==== App stores ====
Applications for mobile devices (cellphones and tablets) have been termed "apps" in recent years. Apple chose to funnel iPhone and iPad app sales through their App Store, and thus both vet apps, and get a cut of every paid app sold. Apple does not allow apps which could be used to circumvent their app store (e.g. virtual machines such as the Java or Flash virtual machines).

The Android platform, by contrast, has multiple app stores available for it, and users can generally select which to use (although Google Play requires a compatible or rooted device).

This move was replicated for desktop operating systems with GNOME Software (for Linux), the Mac App Store (for macOS), and the Windows Store (for Windows). All of these platforms remain, as they have always been, non-exclusive: they allow applications to be installed from outside the app store, and indeed from other app stores.

The explosive rise in popularity of apps, for the iPhone in particular but also for Android, led to a kind of "gold rush", with some programmers dedicating a significant amount of time to creating apps hoping to strike them rich. Nevertheless, not all of these entrepreneurs were successful.

== Formalization of software development ==
The development of curricula in computer science has resulted in improvements in software development. Components of these curricula include:

1. Structured and Object Oriented programming
2. Data structures
3. Analysis of Algorithms
4. Formal languages and compiler construction
5. Computer Graphics Algorithms
6. Sorting and Searching
7. Numerical Methods, Optimization and Statistics
8. Artificial Intelligence and Machine Learning

== How software has affected hardware ==
As more and more programs enter the realm of firmware, and the hardware itself becomes smaller, cheaper and faster as predicted by Moore's law, an increasing number of types of functionality of computing first carried out by software, have joined the ranks of hardware, as for example with graphics processing units. (However, the change has sometimes gone the other way for cost or other reasons, as for example with softmodems and microcode.)

Most hardware companies today have more software programmers on the payroll than hardware designers, since software tools have automated many tasks of printed circuit board (PCB) engineers.

== Computer software and programming language timeline ==
The following tables include year by year development of many different aspects of computer software including:

- High level languages
- Operating systems
- Networking software and applications
- Computer graphics hardware, algorithms and applications
- Spreadsheets
- Word processing
- Computer aided design

=== 1971–1974 ===
	1971	1972	1973	1974
Programming languages	CDL; KRL; SUE	C INTERCAL; PL/M; Prolog; Smalltalk; SQL	COMAL; LIS; ML; Speakeasy-3	BASIC FOUR; CLU; GRASS; PROSE
Operating systems	DEC RSTS-11	Data General; RDOS	Soviet ALGOL 68	DEC DOS-11
Computer networks		Wozniak's; Blue Box	Bob Metcalfe develops Ethernet	
Computer graphics		Newell & Sancha visible surface algorithm		Catmull & Straber develop z-buffer
CAD/CAM	MCS founded	ADAM	Auto-Draft	Tektronix 4014

=== 1975–1978 ===
	1975	1976	1977	1978
Programming languages	ABC; Altair BASIC; CS-4; Modula; Scheme	Mesa; Plus; Ratfor; S SAM76; SAS; Smalltalk-76	Blue; Bourne Shell; Commodore BASIC; FP; Icon; IDL; Red; Standard MUMPS; Yellow; IDL	C shell HAL/S; MATLAB; RPG III; SMALL; VisiCalc; SQL
Operating systems	CP/M	Cambridge CAP	1BSD	2BSD; Apple DOS
Computer networks	Telenet packet switching			
Computer graphics	EDS founded		Antialiasing	
Word processors		Electric Pencil		AppleWriter
CAD/CAM	Solid modeling	McDonnell Douglas buys Unigraphics	Forerunner to CATIA	Raster graphics display

=== 1979–1982 ===
	1979	1980	1981	1982
Programming languages	AWK; Icon; Modula-2; REXX; Vulcan dBase-II	Ada 80; C with Classes; CBASIC	BBC BASIC; IBM BASICA	Draco; PostScript; Speakeasy-IV
Operating systems	Atari DOS	86-DOS	MS-DOS 1 Acorn MOS	Commodore DOS
Computer networks	Usenet	TCP/IP		
Computer graphics				Silicon Graphics founded
Word processors	WordStar	WordPerfect for DG Mini	Bank Street; AppleWriter II	WordStar 3.0; WordPerfect for DOS
Spreadsheet	VisiCalc		Lotus 1-2-3	
CAD/CAM	IGES	VersaCAD	Dassault Systèmes	Autodesk founded

=== 1983–1986 ===
	1983	1984	1985	1986
Programming languages	ABAP; Ada 83; C++ GW-BASIC; Korn Shell; Objective-C occam True BASIC; Turbo Pascal	Clipper; Common Lisp; Good Old MAD (GOM); OPL; Redcode; RPL; Standard ML; MATLAB; Framework FRED	Paradox; QuickBASIC; Framework II FRED	CorVision; Eiffel; GFA BASIC; Informix-4GL; LabVIEW; Miranda; Object Pascal; PROMAL
Operating systems	MS-DOS 2 Lisa Office; SunOS 1	MS-DOS 3 System Software	Windows 1.0; Atari TOS; AmigaOS	AIX 1
Computer networks	ARPANET splits off MILNET	Novell NetWare; Research In Motion founded	NSFNET connects 5 Supercomputers	
Computer graphics			ATI founded	Intel 82786 coprocessor
Word processors	Word 1 for DOS	Word 1 for Mac	WordPerfect 4.2 for DOS	
Spreadsheet			Excel for Mac	
CAD/CAM	Autodesk releases AutoCAD 1.2,1.3,1.4	AutoCAD 2	Bentley Systems; Parametric Technology	AutoLISP

=== 1987–1990 ===
	1987	1988	1989	1990
Programming languages	Ada ISO 8652; Clean; Erlang; HyperTalk; Mathematica; Oberon occam 2 Perl; Self; Turbo Basic	A+ Hamilton C shell Object REXX; Octave; RPG/400; SPARK; STOS BASIC; Tcl; Mathematica; Framework III FRED	Bash; LPC; Modula-3; PowerBASIC; Turbo Pascal OOP; VisSim; FL	AMOS BASIC; AMPL; EuLisp; Haskell; J Object Oberon; Z Shell
Operating systems	Windows 2.0	MS-DOS 4 Windows 2.1x OS/2; A/UX	EPCO	Windows 3.0
Computer networks		Morris worm	World Wide Web starts	HTML
Computer graphics	JPEG and GIF	Pixar's Tin Toy wins Oscar	AutoDesk 3D Studio	
Word processors	Microsoft Works for DOS	PC Magazine Reviews; 55 Packages	WordPerfect 5.1; Word for Windows	Microsoft Office for Windows
Spreadsheet	Excel for Windows	Quattro Pro		
CAD/CAM	Deneba releases Canvas X AutoCAD 9	CATIA 3 AutoCAD 10	Parametric T-Flex	Visionary Design Systems founded AutoCAD 11; ACIS 1

=== 1991–1994 ===
	1991	1992	1993	1994
Programming languages	GNU E Oberon-2; Oz; Q Visual Basic; Python; Framework IV FRED	Turbo Pascal; Dylan	Ruby; AppleScript; Brainfuck; K Lua; NewtonScript; R Transcript; Self; ZPL	CLOS; ANS Forth; ANSI Common Lisp; Claire; Pike; RAPID
Operating systems	MS-DOS 5 Linux	Windows 3.1x 386BSD	MS-DOS 6 Newton OS; Solaris	AIX 4.0, 4.1
Computer networks		Mosaic web browser	NetWare 4	Netscape Navigator
Computer graphics		OpenGL	Nvidia founded	
Word processors	Microsoft Works			Novell buys WordPerfect
CAD/CAM	EDS buys Unigraphics	CADAM & CATIA begin unification	AutoCAD 12	Simple Vector; Format

=== 1995–1998 ===
	1995	1996	1997	1998
Programming languages	Ada 95; ColdFusion; Delphi; Java; JavaScript; LiveScript; PHP; Ruby	Curl; Lasso; NetRexx; OCaml; Perl Data Language; WebDNA	Component Pascal; E ECMAScript; F-Script; ISLISP; Pico; Rebol; Squeak; Tea	M2001; Open Source Erlang; Pikt; PureBasic; REALbasic; Standard C++ UnrealScript
Operating systems	Windows 95; Digital UNIX	Windows NT 4.0; Palm OS	Inferno; Mac OS 7.6; Mac OS 8	Windows 98; Solaris 7 64-bit
Computer networks	The research proposal for Google was formed.	Mosaic web browser Inter@ctive Pager	NetWare 4	Netscape Navigator
Computer graphics	Pixar Goes Public after Toy Story	3Dfx Voodoo	ATI Rage Pro	Voodoo Banshee
Word processors	Word 95 for Windows	Corel buys WordPerfect from Novell		
CAD/CAM	MicroStation Advanced solid modeling	Canvas 5	ISO 13567; AutoCAD 14	Dassault Systèmes buys Matra Datavision products

=== 1999–2002 ===
	1999	2000	2001	2002
Programming languages	D GameMaker Language; Harbour; XSLT	ActionScript; C# Ferite; Join Java; Joy; XL; Visual Basic (.NET)	AspectJ; GDScript; Processing; RPG IV	Gosu; Io
Operating systems	Mac OS X Server 1.0; Mac OS 9	Windows 2000; Windows ME; Mac OS X Public Beta	v10.0 Cheetah v10.1 Puma; Windows XP	Windows XP 64-bit Edition; 10.2 Jaguar
Computer networks	BlackBerry 850		NetWare 4	Netscape Navigator
Computer graphics	S3 Savage 4 GeForce 256	Radeon DDR (R100)	Nvidia Kyro II; GeForce 3	
Word processors	Sun buys Star Division			
CAD/CAM	Pro/Engineer 2000	AutoCAD 2000	EDS buys SDRC	Unigraphics NX; Autodesk buys Revit

=== 2003–2006 ===
	2003	2004	2005	2006
Programming languages	Factor; Nemerle; Scala; Squirrel	Alma-0; Boo; FreeBASIC; Groovy; Little b Subtext	Ada 2005; F#	Cobra; Links; OptimJ; Windows PowerShell
Operating systems	v10.3 Panther; Red Hat; Enterprise Linux; Windows Server 2003		v10.4 Tiger; Ubuntu 5 Windows XP Professional x64 Edition	
Computer networks	802.11g Apple Safari	Gmail; Facebook founded Mozilla Firefox		BlackBerry Pearl 8100

=== 2007–2010 ===
	2007	2008	2009	2010
Programming languages	Clojure; Fantom; Fortress; LOLCODE; Oberon-07; Vala	Genie; Pure	CoffeeScript; Go; Idris; Parasail	Chapel; RPG Open Access; Rust
Operating systems	Windows Vista v10.5 Leopard	Android	Windows 7 v10.6 Snow Leopard; Android 1.5 "Cupcake"; Android 1.6 "Donut"; Android 2.0–2.1 "Eclair"	Android 2.2 "Froyo"; Android 2.3 "Gingerbread"
Computer networks		Google Chrome; Chromium	Wi-Fi 802.11n	
Computer graphics		Assassin's Creed	Up Cloth; Simulation	Avatar wins "Best Picture"
Word processors		Oracle buys OpenOffice from Sun	Oracle releases OpenOffice to Apache Software Foundation	
CAD/CAM	Siemens buys UGS			

=== 2011–2014 ===
	2011	2012	2013	2014
Programming languages	Dart	Ada 2012; Elixir; Julia; TypeScript CryEngine#CryEngine 3 (BeamNG.drive)	Xojo	Hack; Swift
Operating systems	v10.7 Lion; Android 3.x "Honeycomb"; Android 4.0 "Ice Cream Sandwich"	Windows 8 v10.8 Mountain Lion; Android 4.1.x–4.2.x "Jelly Bean"	v10.9 Mavericks; Windows 8.1; Android 4.3 "Jelly Bean"; Android 4.4 "KitKat"	v10.10 Yosemite; Android 5.0 "Lollipop"
Computer networks		802.11ac		
Computer graphics	Hugo wins Oscar; Visual Effects	CryEngine3 and its 3D soft body physics		

== See also ==
- Forensic software engineering
- History of computing hardware
- History of operating systems
- History of software engineering
- List of failed and overbudget custom software projects
- List of pioneers in computer science
- Women in computing
- Timeline of women in computing
