= Shannon D. Cramer =

Former senior officer in the United States Navy

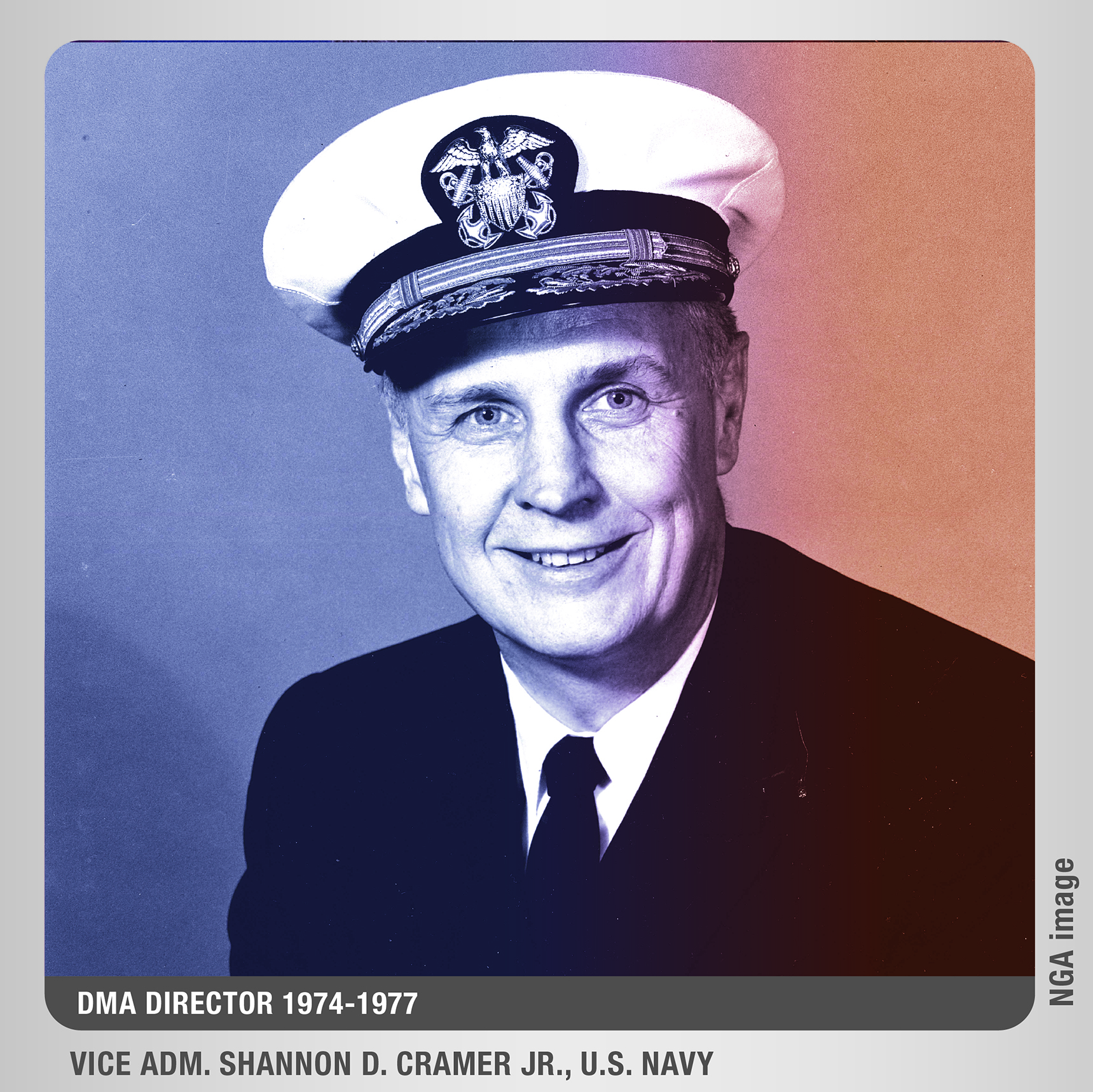
- Official portrait of Shannon D. Cramer
- Born: September 18, 1921; Washington D.C., U.S.
- Died: February 15, 2012 (aged 90)
- Allegiance: United States of America
- Branch: United States Navy

Shannon D. Cramer Jr. (September 18, 1921 – February 15, 2012) was a United States Navy vice admiral. He was second director of the Defense Mapping Agency from September 1974 to August 1977. From April to September 1974, he was deputy director for plans, Defense Intelligence Agency.

== Early life, and career ==
He was born on September 18, 1921, in Washington, D.C. There he attended Central High School, and graduated in 1939.

Cramer graduated from the U.S. Naval Academy in 1943. He served aboard the USS Laub (DD-613), the USS Furse (DDR-882), the USS Cochino (SS-345), the USS Halfbeak (SS-352), the USS Cobbler (SS-344), and the USS Sirago (SS-485).

He commanded the USS Swordfish (SSN-579), the Gold Crew of the USS Patrick Henry (SSBN-599), Submarine Division 102, and Submarine Squadron 15.

Cramer's other assignments included:

- Staff of Commander Destroyer Squadron 6
- Aide to the executive officer of the submarine base
- Head of the Reserve Training and Ordnance Departments
- Submarine advisor to the Chief of Naval Reactors Office, Atomic Energy Commission
- Head of the Material and Submarine Propulsion Sections, Office of the Chief of Naval Operations
- Deputy director of operations in the National Military Command Systems, J-3, Joint Chiefs of Staff
- Military assistant to the Assistant Secretary of Defense (Public Affairs).

Cramer became commander, Submarine Flotilla 6 in May 1970; and in August 1972, he reported as deputy director (strategic) of J-5, the Joint Staff, Office of the Joint Chiefs of Staff.

== Later career ==
From April to September 1974, Cramer was deputy director for Plans, Defense Intelligence Agency. He took charge of Defense Mapping Agency (DMA) as director in September 1974, succeeding Howard W. Penney. He consolidated and streamlined production elements of the DMA. He directed the efficiencies to the growing demands of the services and commands for geographic information. While increasing the output of mapping, charting and geodetic products and services. By consolidating the DMA Hydrographic and Topographic Centers, he eliminated duplicate functions while combining production equipment and manpower resources. At the same time, he maximized the Agency's responsiveness to current and future needs of the armed services and military commands. He retired in 1977.

Following retirement, he served as the Department of Defense/Joint Chief of Staff representative to the United Nations Law of the Sea Conference from 1978 to 1981.

== Death ==
Cramer died on February 15, 2012; at his home in Washington, D.C. He was 90 years old at the time of death.

== Accolades ==
Vice Admiral Cramer was recognized for his outstanding contribution as director of DMA and was inducted into the National Imagery and Mapping Agency Hall of Fame in 2003. Vice Admiral Cramer's decorations and awards include:

- Legion of Merit with four gold stars
- American Defense Service Medal
- American Campaign Medal
- European-African-Middle Eastern Campaign Medal with two stars
- Asiatic Pacific Campaign Medal
- World War II Victory Medal
- Navy Occupation Service Medal
- Europe Clasp
- National Defense Service Medal with bronze star

Government offices
Preceded by Howard W. Penney	Director of the Defense Mapping Agency; September 1974 – August 1977	Succeeded by Abner B. Martin
