= Admiral Wilkinson =

Admiral Wilkinson may refer to:

- Eugene Parks Wilkinson (1918–2013), U.S. Navy vice admiral
- Edward A. Wilkinson (1933–2020), U.S. Navy rear admiral
- Peter Wilkinson (Royal Navy officer) (born 1956), British Royal Navy vice admiral
- Theodore Stark Wilkinson (1888–1946), U.S. Navy vice admiral
