= Richard M. Wells =

U.S. Army Major General (1929–2015)

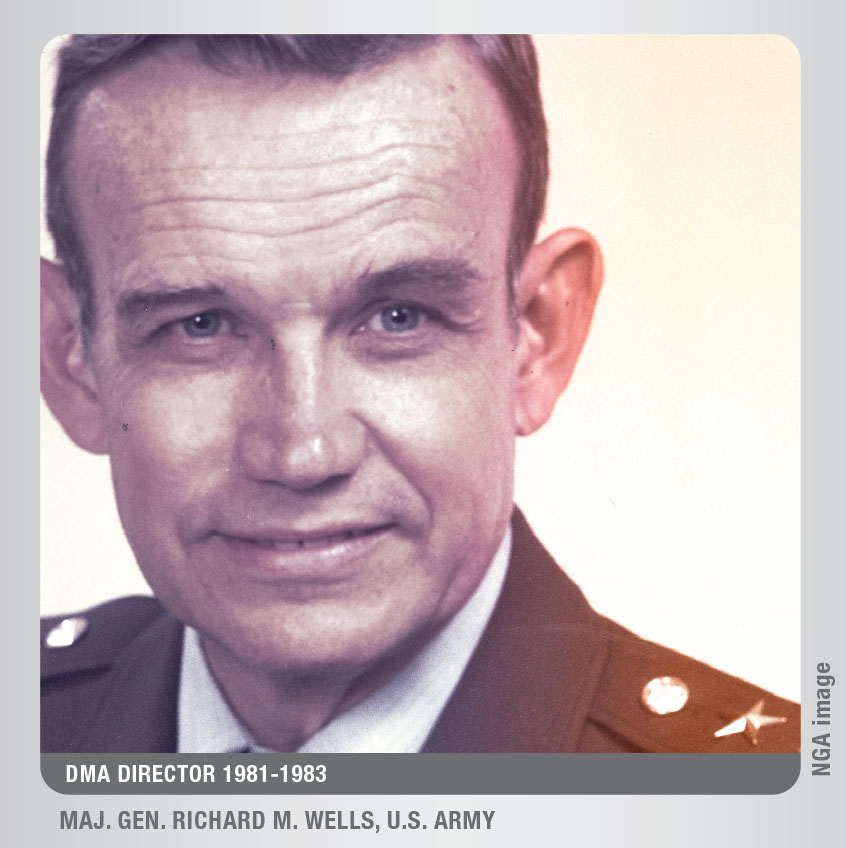
- Official portrait of Major General Wells
- Born: November 28, 1929; Washington, D.C., US
- Died: October 22, 2015 (aged 85)
- Allegiance: United States of America
- Branch: United States Army
- Service years: 1970–1984
- Rank: Major General

Major General Richard Marshall Wells (November 28, 1929 – October 22, 2015) was an officer in the United States Army who was Director of Defense Mapping Agency from August 1981 to June 1983.

== Education ==
Major General Wells graduated from the U.S. Military Academy in 1951 and received an MS from Iowa State University in 1956. In 1964 he completed the Naval War College, simultaneously earning an MA in international affairs from George Washington University. He graduated from the National War College in 1969.

== Career ==
After one year in Korea, Major General Wells taught engineering at the U.S. Naval Academy for three years, served in the Office of the Chief of Engineers, and commanded the 84th Engineer Battalion (Construction) in the Republic of Vietnam.

Beginning in September 1970, he served in Washington, DC, as chief of the Strategic Mobility and Readiness Team in the Planning and Programming Analysis Directorate of the Office of the Assistant Vice Chief of Staff, U.S. Army. He moved to Chicago in August 1971, where he served for two years as district engineer in the U.S. Army Corps of Engineers’ Chicago District.

Wells then became chief of the Engineer Branch of the Office of Personnel Directorate for the U.S. Army. He commanded the 4th Advanced Individual Training Brigade in Fort Leonard Wood, Missouri, prior to his appointment as division engineer of the U.S. Army Engineer Division, Middle East, in Saudi Arabia; a position he held until July 1978.

From 1978 to 1981, he served as division engineer of the U.S. Army Engineer Division, North Pacific, in Portland, Oregon.

== Defense Mapping Agency ==
As director of the Defense Mapping Agency from 1981 to 1983, Major General Wells provided critical leadership as the agency embarked on a $2.6 billion modernization program during the transition of the national intelligence and mapping program from a film-based program to a flexible, digital-based satellite imaging system. Wells presented the technical and funding plan through the Office of the Secretary of Defense to Congress and successfully secured the plan’s approval and funding.

In July 1983, after his tour as director of DMA, Wells became deputy chief of engineers in the Army’s Office of the Chief of Engineers, in Washington, DC. He retired from the Army in 1984.

== Death ==
Wells died on October 22, 2015, at the age of 85.

== Accolades ==
Major General Wells was inducted into the NGA Hall of Fame in 2004. His other military decorations include the Legion of Merit with oak leaf cluster, a bronze star medal in Korea, and two Air Medals in Vietnam.

Government offices
Preceded by William L. Nicholson	Director of the Defense Mapping Agency; August 1981 – June 1983	Succeeded by Edward A. Wilkinson
