= Communications Satellite Act of 1962 =

American federal law enacted in 1962

- Long title: An Act to provide for the establishment, ownership, operation, and regulation of a commercial communications satellite system, and for other purposes.
- Acronyms (colloquial): CSA
- Enacted by: the 87th United States Congress
- Effective: August 31, 1962

Citations
- Public law: 87-624
- Statutes at Large: 76 Stat. 419

Codification
- Titles amended: 47 U.S.C.: Telegraphy
- U.S.C. sections created: 47 U.S.C. ch. 6 § 701 et seq.

Legislative history
- Introduced in the House as H.R. 11040 by Oren Harris (D–AR) on April 2, 1962; Passed the House on May 3, 1962 (354-9); Passed the Senate on August 17, 1962 (66-11) with amendment; House agreed to Senate amendment on August 27, 1962 (372-10, provisions of H.Res. 769); Signed into law by President John F. Kennedy on August 31, 1962

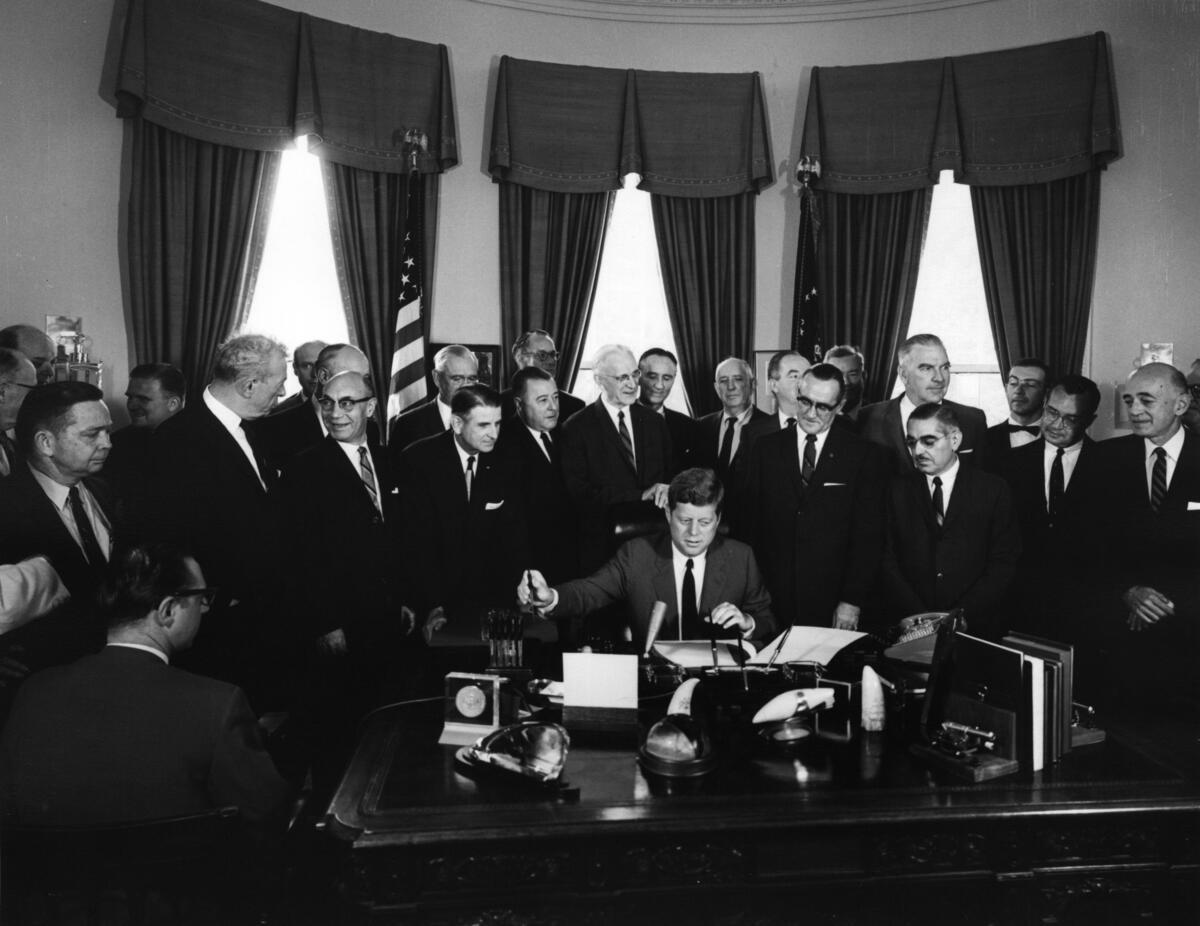
President John F. Kennedy signing the act.

The Communications Satellite Act of 1962 was passed in order to deal with issues related to the commercialization of satellite communications. The act aimed to join private communication companies in order to make satellites more obtainable.

This act was very controversial, and was left very open-ended. The act was signed August 31, 1962 by President John F. Kennedy.

== Dissent ==
Democratic Senator Russell B. Long of Louisiana said of the act, "When this bill first started out I thought it was as crooked as a dog's hind leg. I am now convinced that that would be a compliment. This bill is as crooked as a barrel of snakes." The American Telephone and Telegraph Company (AT&T) argued that using space for communications was just a modern representation of the submarine communications cables currently in use. AT&T proposed joint ownership of all of the communications satellites, with control based on the system facilities, but since AT&T had a majority of world communications this proposition was opposed by other communication companies. The Federal Communications Commission (FCC) proposed that the ten companies join in a program, but this was put down with antitrust legislation.

The compromise allowing the bill to pass was that there would be government regulation on the communication industry. The United States Congress made it so that all companies registered by the FCC had nondiscriminatory access to the satellite systems. This would allow competition to develop among the companies, thus preventing trusts from forming. The United States Government, including the President, NASA, and the FCC, were all to maintain certain duties to monitor the communications satellites.

The President was to observe every aspect of the development and operation of the satellite systems. He was also made responsible for providing arrangements with foreign participation. NASA was designated as a technical advisor for the FCC and the communications corporation to the extent that would aid the nation. NASA was to receive reimbursement for the services it rendered. The largest burden on regulation fell on the FCC, which was made responsible for making sure that competition is present, and that small businesses would be able to participate.

== Regulation committees established ==
The act created a board of directors to oversee regulation of the act. There were to be 15 members of this board; three appointed by the president, six chosen by public stock holders, and the remaining six chosen by communication carriers that are authorized by the FCC. This board of directors was to control the public satellite systems. Stock shares for this board were to be sold for $100, thus providing finances for the board.

== The completed act ==
The act was very ambiguous about the responsibilities of the regulators and the direction that the companies were to go; however, the act provided a start towards a global communications system. Section 301 of the act provided Congress the right to "repeal, alter, or amend." This would be necessary in order make clear the future regulation done by the committees established by the act.

== Comments on the act after passing ==
In 1963, the year after the act passed, President Lyndon B. Johnson reported to Congress that the "act is progressing well in light of the complexities of the problem." Yet, little had actually been accomplished by this point. No communication satellites had been launched and only some research had been conducted to provide moving for moving forward. In President Johnson's next report to congress on March 17, 1967, he stated that, "the Communications Satellite Act of 1962 [has] brought mankind to the threshold of a full-time global communications service to which all nations of the world may have equal access." This time, much had been accomplished towards a global communications system. COMSAT had been joined by 17 nations for the creation of the International Telecommunications Satellite Organization (now known as Intelsat). (Columbia Encyclopedia). Fifty five nations had joined Intelsat, which was a consortium established to provide an intergovernmental owning of communications satellites. Intelsat was created at a time when private companies were unwilling to invest in Satellite technology, shortly after the passing of the act (Gruenwald 1998).
