= GNU Manifesto =

1985 call to action to create a free computer operating system

GNU logo

The GNU Manifesto is a call-to-action by Richard Stallman encouraging participation and support of the GNU Project's goal in developing the GNU free computer operating system. The GNU Manifesto was published in March 1985 in Dr. Dobb's Journal. It is held in high regard within the free software movement as a fundamental philosophical source.

The full text is included with GNU software such as Emacs, and is publicly available.

== Background ==
Some parts of the GNU Manifesto began as an announcement of the GNU Project posted by Richard Stallman on September 27, 1983, in form of an email on Usenet newsgroups. The project's aim was to give computer users freedom and control over their computers by collaboratively developing and providing software that is based on Stallman's idea of software freedom (although the written definition did not exist until February 1986). The manifesto was written to familiarize more people with these concepts, and to find more support in the form of work, funding, programs and hardware.

The GNU Manifesto was published with its title and full written form in 1985 but was updated slightly in 1987.

== Summary ==
The GNU Manifesto opens with an explanation of what the GNU Project is, and what is the current, at the time, progress in creation of the GNU operating system. The system, although based on, and compatible with Unix, is meant by the author to have many improvements over it, which are listed in detail in the manifesto.

One of the major driving points behind the GNU project, according to Stallman, was the rapid (at the time) trend toward Unix and its various components becoming proprietary (i.e. closed-source and non-libre) software.

The manifesto lays a philosophical basis for launching the project, and importance of bringing it to fruition — proprietary software is a way to divide users, who are no longer able to help each other. Stallman refuses to write proprietary software as a sign of solidarity with them.

The author provides many reasons for why the project and software freedom is beneficial to users, although he agrees that its wide adoption will make the work of programmers less profitable.

A large part of the GNU Manifesto is focused on rebutting possible objections to GNU Project's goals. They include the programmer's need to make a living, the issue of advertising and distributing free software, and the perceived need of a profit incentive.

== See also ==
- History of free and open-source software
- "An Open Letter to Hobbyists" – 1976 letter by Bill Gates to PC hobbyists
