= GNU E =

- Paradigm: object-oriented
- First appeared: 1991
- Stable release: 2.3.3 / May 28, 1993
- Typing discipline: strong
- OS: Cross-platform
- License: GNU General Public License Version 2
- Website: ftp://ftp.cs.wisc.edu/exodus/E/

Influenced by
- C++

GNU E is an extension of C++ designed for writing software systems to support persistent applications. It was designed as part of the Exodus project.
