= William L. Nicholson =

United States Air Force general (1926–2020)

William L. Nicholson III
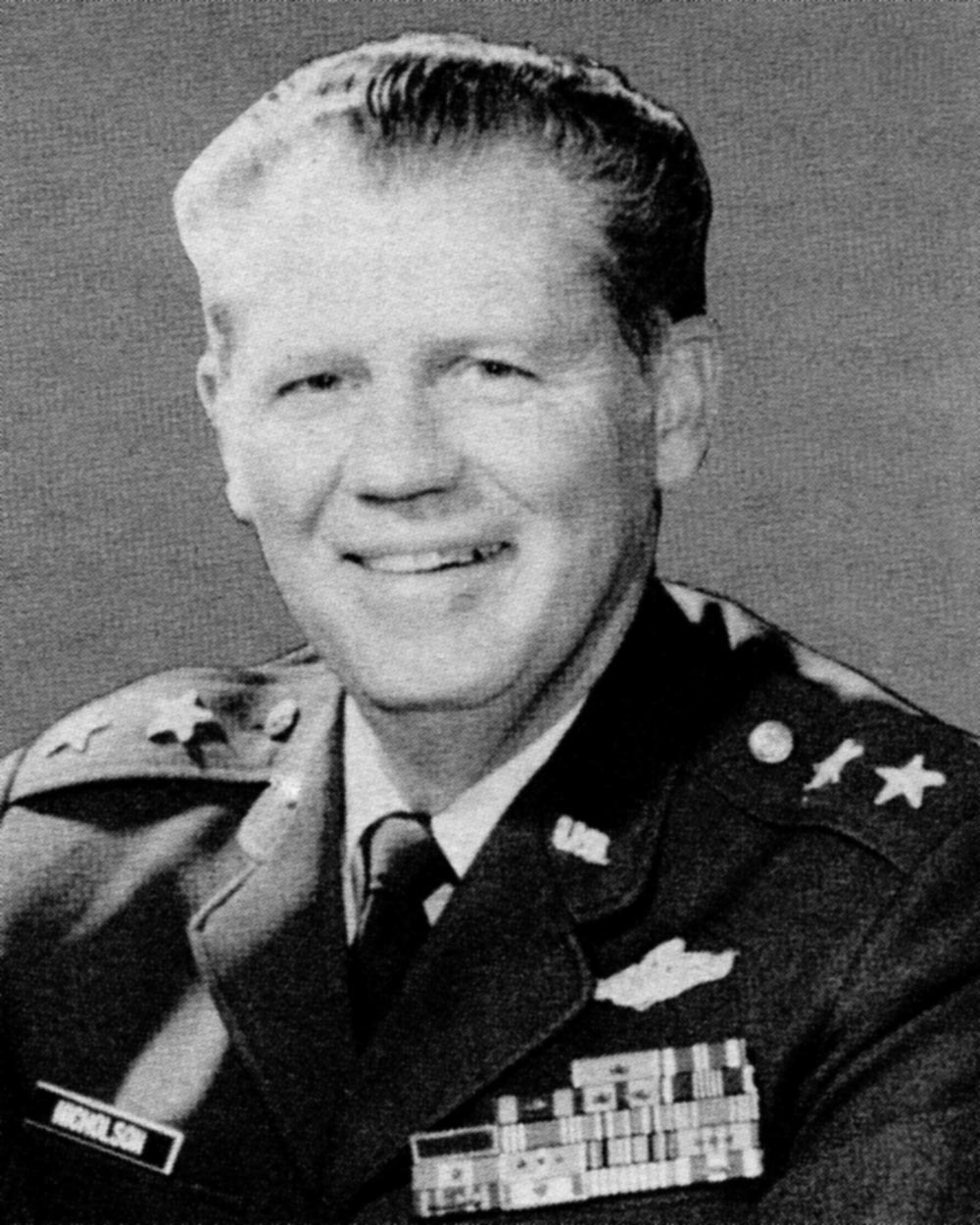
- Born: March 9, 1926; Union, Missouri, US
- Died: November 25, 2020 (aged 94); Alexandria, Virginia, US
- Military career
- Allegiance: United States of America
- Branch: United States Air Force
- Service years: 1950–1981
- Rank: Major General
- Commands: Director, Defense Mapping Agency; Commandant, Air Command and Staff College; Vice commander, Fifteenth Air Force

William Lloyd Nicholson III (March 9, 1926 – November 25, 2020) was an American Air Force major general. As his last assignment, he was director of the Defense Mapping Agency from July 1979 – June 1981.

== Early life ==
Nicholson was born in 1926, in Union, Missouri. He graduated from high school in May 1944 and immediately entered military service as an aviation cadet in the U.S. Army Air Forces. World War II ended prior to his completion of pilot training, and he returned to civilian life in November 1945. He resumed his studies and graduated from Parks College of St. Louis (Missouri) University with a bachelor of science degree in both aeronautical engineering and meteorology in June 1950. He graduated from the Air Command and Staff College at Maxwell Air Force Base, Alabama, in 1960, and the National War College of Fort Lesley J. McNair, Washington, D.C., in 1970. While at the latter school he concurrently earned a master's degree in international relations from The George Washington University, Washington, D.C.

== Military career ==
After graduation from Parks College, he completed his Reserve Officers' Training Corps requirements, was commissioned a second lieutenant in the U.S. Air Force and returned to active duty in September 1950. He received his pilot wings at Williams Air Force Base, Arizona, in October 1951. He then attended F-84 combat crew training at Luke Air Force Base, Arizona.

In March 1952 Nicholson was assigned to the 58th Fighter-Bomber Wing in Korea. In October 1952, while on a combat mission over North Korea, he was shot down, evaded capture and returned to the wing to complete his combat tour of duty. He returned to the United States in February 1953 and was assigned to the 4240th Combat Crew Training Wing at McCoy Air Force Base, Florida, where he trained pilots in F-84s and T-33s for combat duty in Korea. In June 1954 Nicholson transferred to McConnell Air Force Base, Kansas, where he was director of materiel for the 3520th Tactical Fighter Group. His next assignment was with Headquarters Air Training Command at Randolph Air Force Base, Texas, where he served as an air operations officer from June 1955 to September 1959. He then attended Air Command and Staff College.

Nicholson transferred to the Republic of Vietnam and was assigned to the Military Assistance Advisory Group, Vietnam at Bien Hoa Air Base as air operations adviser to the 1st Fighter Squadron of the Republic of Vietnam air force. During this tour of duty, he flew 200 combat missions in A-1 Skyraiders. Because of his combat experience he was selected by the commander in chief of Pacific Air Forces to serve as staff officer in the Directorate of Plans at Hickam Air Force Base, Hawaii.

In August 1964 Nicholson transferred to Headquarters U.S. Air Force, Washington, D.C., where he served as a staff officer in the Directorate of Plans, Office of the Deputy Chief of Staff, Plans and Operations. In June 1966 he was assigned to the Organization of the Joint Chiefs of Staff as executive officer to the director for operations. In August 1969 he entered the National War College. In October 1970 Nicholson transferred to Davis-Monthan Air Force Base, Arizona, where he flew F-4s in preparation for another combat tour of duty in Southeast Asia. However, due to the reduction in forces in Southeast Asia, he was assigned in March 1971 to Grissom Air Force Base, Ind., as vice commander of the 305th Air Refueling Wing.

Nicholson transferred to Lockbourne Air Force Base, Ohio, in March 1972 where he assumed the position of commander, 301st Air Refueling Wing. In June 1972 he transferred with the wing and its KC-135s to Don Muang Royal Thai Air Base, Thailand. Later, he organized and commanded the 310th Strategic Wing at U-Tapao Royal Thai Navy Airfield, Thailand. In December 1972 Nicholson rejoined the 301st Air Refueling Wing as commander at Lockbourne Air Force Base. Shortly thereafter, he moved with elements of the wing to Clark Air Base, the Philippines, organized the 4102nd Air Refueling Squadron and participated in Linebacker II, the 11-day air operation over North Vietnam in December 1972. He and his unit returned to Lockbourne in January 1973.

In April 1973 Nicholson assumed command and directed the reconstitution of the 97th Bombardment Wing, Blytheville Air Force Base, Arkansas. He transferred to the Organization of the Joint Chiefs of Staff (J-5), in June 1974 as assistant deputy director for force development and strategic plans. He was assigned as deputy director for operations (strategic and general operations), Joint Staff, in May 1975. In September 1975 he assumed duty as commandant of the Air Command and Staff College. Nicholson became vice commander, Fifteenth Air Force, in March 1978.

Nicholson was promoted to major general April 1, 1977, with date of rank December 1, 1973. He became director of Defense Mapping Agency in July 1979; till his retirement in June 1981. He retired on July 1, 1981 and died on November 25, 2020.

== Accolades ==
Nicholson's military decorations and awards include:

- Legion of Merit with oak leaf cluster
- Distinguished Flying Cross
- Air Medal with oak leaf cluster
- Air Force Commendation Medal with two oak leaf clusters
- Army Commendation Medal
- Presidential Unit Citation emblem
- Republic of Korea Presidential Unit Citation.

Government offices
Preceded by Abner B. Martin	Director of the Defense Mapping Agency; July 1979 – June 1981	Succeeded by Richard M. Wells
