= Attorney General Wells =

Attorney General Wells may refer to:

- Dean Wells (politician) (born 1949), Attorney-General of Queensland
- Edmund W. Wells (1846–1938), Attorney General of the Territory of Arizona
- Horatio Wells (1808–1858), Attorney General of the Territory of Wisconsin
- John S. Wells (1803–1860), Attorney General of New Hampshire
- Robert William Wells (1795–1864), Attorney General of Missouri

== See also ==
- General Wells (disambiguation)
