= Xbiff =

xbiff
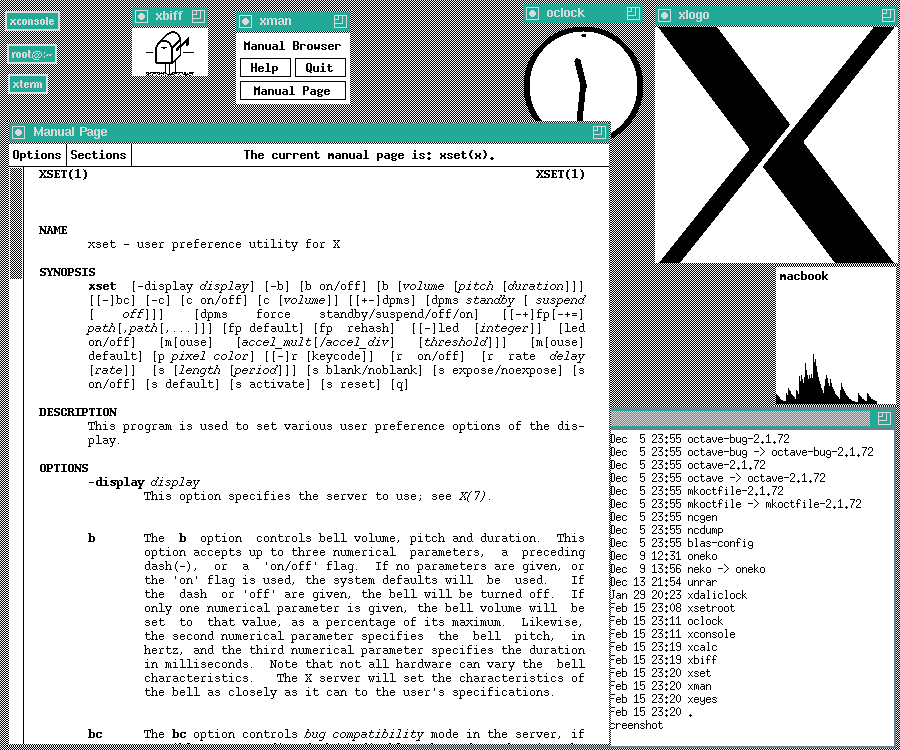
- The xbiff utility running among other default X Window System applications.
- Stable release: 1.0.6 / 18 April 2026; 3 months ago
- Operating system: Unix-like
- Type: X Window System that shows a mailbox
- Website: https://gitlab.freedesktop.org/xorg/app/xbiff
- Repository: gitlab.freedesktop.org/xorg/app/xbiff

xbiff is a small utility for the X Window System that shows a mailbox with its flag raised whenever the user has new e-mail. It is included in almost every X Window System.

== See also ==
- biff (Unix)
