= Marisat =

Series of communications satellites

Inmarsat MARISAT
- Country/ies of origin: United Kingdom (UK)
- Operator(s): Inmarsat & ESA
- Type: Communications Satellite
- Status: Decommissioned

Constellation size
- First launch: 19 February 1976
- Last launch: 10 June 1976
- Total launches: 3
- Website: https://www.inmarsat.com/

Marisat satellites were the first mobile telecommunications satellites and were designed to provide dependable telecommunications for commercial shipping and the U.S. Navy from stable geosynchronous orbital locations over the three major ocean regions. The three Marisat satellites, F1, F2, and F3, were built by Hughes Aircraft Corporation (HAC) for COMSAT Corporation starting in 1973. The satellites were designed to provide maritime telecommunications services in three large ocean areas, the Atlantic Ocean, the Pacific Ocean, and the Indian Ocean, and were located at 72.5° East longitude, 176.5° E, and 345° E in the geosynchronous orbital arc. The three-satellite Marisat system served as the initial INMARSAT constellation.

Ownership of the three Marisat satellites was transferred to Lockheed Martin when it bought COMSAT Corp in 2000. The Marisat-F2 satellite was acquired by Intelsat as part of the COMSAT General Corp. acquisition in October 2004.

The three satellites were all launched in 1976. MARISAT F1 was launched on 19 February 1976, MARISAT F2 was launched on 10 June 1976, and Marisat F3 was launched at 22:44 GMT, 14 October 1976. Launch vehicle for the satellites was the McDonnell Douglas 2914 Delta rocket. The satellites were launched from Cape Canaveral by the National Aeronautics and Space Administration under contract with COMSAT. In 1981 the Inmarsat took over from the Marisat system.

== Design ==
The satellites were designed to be identical, with three communications payloads on board; an ultrahigh frequency UHF (240 to 400 MHz) payload for the U.S. Navy, L-band (1.5 to 1.6 GHz) for ship communications via voice, telex, facsimile and high speed data, and C band (6/4 GHz) for communications to fixed shore stations.

The Marisat satellites were a cylindrical spinning satellite design similar to earlier satellites like Syncom 1, Intelsat I and II, relying on the gyroscopic forces generated by rotating at approximately 30 rpm to provide stability in the Earth's gravitational field. They were originally designed to last 5 years, but survived much longer, with Marisat F2 operating successfully for 32 years.

The cylindrical design of satellites is good for several reasons:

1. early satellites did not have high power computers and attitude control systems of more modern satellites, and the spinning design provides a good basic method for maintaining a known attitude in orbit about the earth,
2. the cylindrical design maximized the size of the satellite which could fit inside the nose cone (fairing) of the launch vehicle (rocket), and
3. the cylindrical design was a simpler design for a spacecraft which would have a rotating body with a de-spun payload module to allow the antenna to point continuously at the same target on the earth (see Nadir pointing).

The Marisat satellites weighed about 1,450 pounds (660 kg). Each satellite is 12 feet 6 inches (3.81 m) in height and 7 feet 1 inch (2.16 m) in diameter.

=== Payload ===
The UHF payload provided one 500 kHz wide-band channel and two 25 kHz narrow-band channels.

The UHF payload on Marisat was designed as a "gapfiller" to support the U.S. Navy. The U.S. Navy experienced a complete failure of TacSat-1 (the 1960s satellite, not its 2000s name sake) over the Pacific Ocean in December 1972. UHF channels on Lincoln Labs Experimental Satellite LES-6 were also being used over the Atlantic Ocean, but this satellite was expected to have an end-of-life (EOL) of September 1973. This left the U.S. Navy with a potential "gap" in UHF coverage for several years until the first FLTSATCOM satellite would be available in December 1978. The U.S. Navy contracted with COMSAT in 1973 for UHF capability over the Atlantic and Pacific Ocean regions (AOR and POR), and later extended the contract for coverage of the Indian Ocean region (IOR).

=== Solar array ===
Because of the spinning design of the satellite, the exterior of the cylinder body of the satellite was covered with solar cells, forming a solar power generating array. As the satellite spun in orbit, some part of the array would always be lit by the sun and provide power to the satellite power bus. On Marisat the cylindrical solar panel, covered with approximately 7000 solar cells, supplies each satellite with primary power of 330 watts.

== Service ==
Marisat F1 (International Designation: 1976-017A) was operated at 345° E (15° W) from 1976 to 1990. It was relocated to 254° E (106° W) over the Americas until 1997, when it was retired from active service and moved out to a disposal orbit.

Marisat F3 (International Designation: 1976-101A) was operated at 72.5° E until it was retired in the late 1990s and moved out to a disposal orbit.

Marisat F2 (International Designation: 1976-053A) was operated at 176° E from 1976 to 1991. It was relocated to 182 E (178° W) and operated there until 1996. It was relocated to 326.1 E (33.9º W), over the Atlantic Ocean, and since 1999 F2 had been providing a wide-band data link for the National Science Foundation's U.S. Antarctic Program's Amundsen-Scott research station at the South Pole. On Wednesday 29 October 2008, after 32 years of service, the longest for any commercial satellite to date, it was retired from active service. Engineers at INTELSAT used the remaining on-board fuel to raise the orbit of F2 approximately 125 miles (201 km) above the geostationary arc and place it in a disposal orbit.

== See also ==
COMSAT Mobile Communications (CMC)
