= Abner B. Martin =

Director of the United States Defense Mapping Agency (September 1977 to June 1979)

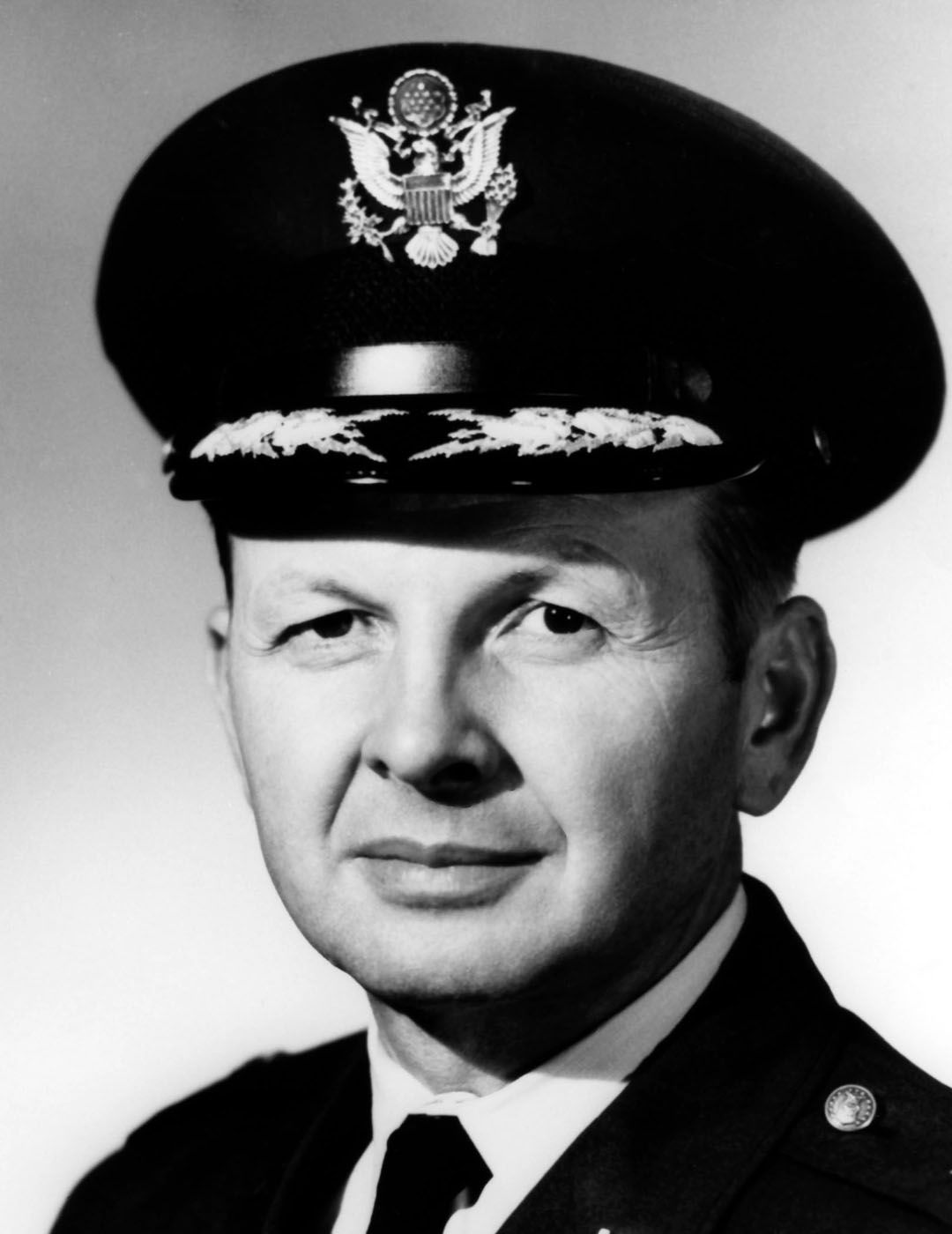
- Official portrait of Lieutenant General Abner B. Martin
- Born: May 25, 1927; Fairforest, South Carolina, U.S.
- Died: August 11, 2011 (aged 84)
- Allegiance: United States of America
- Branch: United States Air Force
- Service years: 1950 to 1979
- Rank: Lieutenant General

Lieutenant General Abner Broadwater Martin (May 25, 1927 – August 11, 2011) was third Director of the United States Defense Mapping Agency from September 1977 to June 1979.

== Early life, and education ==
Lieutenant General Abner B. Martin was born in Fairforest, South Carolina, on May 25, 1927. He attended Clemson College for 18 months and then transferred to North Carolina State College, where he also served in the Army Enlisted Reserve Corps. He received an appointment to the U.S. Military Academy, West Point, New York, and graduated in 1949 with a Bachelor of Science degree in military engineering and a commission as a second lieutenant. He earned a master's degree in weapons systems engineering from the Massachusetts Institute of Technology in 1954, a master's degree in international affairs from The George Washington University in 1965, and graduated from the U.S. Army War College in 1965, and attended the six-week Advanced Management Program of Harvard Business School in 1968.

== Air force career ==
Martin completed flight training in November 1950 and was assigned successively to the Air Training Command at Perrin Air Force Base (AFB), Texas.

General Martin was appointed deputy for reentry systems for the Space and Missile Systems Organization, at Norton Air Force Base, in August 1970, and became deputy for Minuteman, SAMSO, in August 1971. He returned to the Aeronautical Systems Division, Air Force Systems Command, at Wright-Patterson Air Force Base, in January 1974 for duty as the B-1 system program director.

== Defense Mapping Agency ==
Lieutenant General Martin assumed his position as director of the Defense Mapping Agency (DMA) in September 1977 as the third director of the agency, succeeding Shannon D. Cramer.

As director of the Defense Mapping Agency from September 1977 to June 1979, Lt. Gen. Abner Martin responded to the growing demands for digital geographic data required by new aircraft simulators and the strategic and tactical variants of the cruise missile. During his tenure, DMA production processes moved rapidly to provide world coverage of digital data for weapon deployment.

He retired on July 1, 1979.

== Death ==
Martin died on August 11, 2011. He was 84 years old at the time of death. The cause of death was Alzheimer's disease. He was buried with military honors at Fairforest Baptist Church on August 16, 2011.

== Accolades ==
Lieutenant General Martin was a command pilot who wore the Master Missileman Badge. His military decorations and awards include:

- Distinguished Service Medal with oak leaf cluster
- Legion of Merit
- Bronze Star Medal
- Air Force Commendation Medal with oak leaf cluster
- Air Force Outstanding Unit Award
- Air Force Organizational Excellence Award with oak leaf cluster
- American Campaign Medal
- World War II Victory Medal
- National Defense Service Medal with one service star
- Vietnam Service Medal with one service star
- Air Force Longevity Service Award Ribbon with six oak leaf clusters
- Small Arms Expert Marksmanship

Government offices
Preceded by Shannon D. Cramer	Director of the Defense Mapping Agency; September 1977 – June 1979	Succeeded by William L. Nicholson
