= Howard W. Penney =

Former senior officer in the United States Army

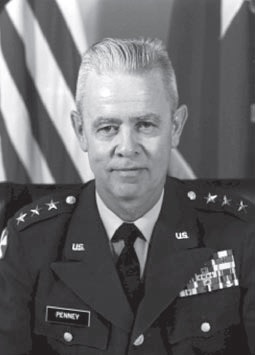
- Official portrait of Lieutenant General Penney
- Born: December 5, 1918
- Died: June 25, 2004 (aged 85)
- Allegiance: United States of America
- Branch: United States Army
- Rank: Lieutenant General
- Awards: Distinguished Service Medal with oak leaf cluster; Legion of Merit with oak leaf cluster; Bronze Star Medal with oak leaf Cluster; Army Commendation Ribbon with oak leaf cluster; Asiatic-Pacific Campaign Medal; American Campaign Medal; American Defense Service Medal; World War II Victory Medal; Army Occupation Medal (Japan); Philippine Liberation Ribbon; National Defense Service Medal; Armed Forces Expeditionary Medal; Republic of Vietnam Service Medal; Vietnamese Service Medal; General Staff Identification Badge; Supreme Headquarters Allied Powers Europe Badge

Lieutenant General Howard W. Penney (December 5, 1918 – June 25, 2004) of United States Army, was first director of Defense Mapping Agency from July 1972 to August 1974. Under Penney's leadership, the new agency focused its assets into a decentralized structure with a lean staff to respond to the rising demands for geographic information by a variety of military users.

== Early life, and education ==
Lieutenant General Penney attended the University of Detroit, and graduated with a BS from the United States Military Academy in 1940. He earned an MS in civil engineering at Texas A&M University in June 1949. He completed the United States Army Command and General Staff College in June 1952, and the National War College in June 1959.

== Defense Mapping Agency ==
In response to President Nixon’s directive of July 1971, Lieutenant General Penney consolidated the Department of Defense's military mapping, charting and geodesy (MC&G) activities and created DMA. Under his leadership from July 1972 to August 1974, the new agency focused these assets into a decentralized structure with a very lean staff to respond to the high demands for geographic information by military users.

== Awards, and decorations ==
In 2001 Lt. Gen. Penney was inducted into the inaugural class of the National Geospatial-Intelligence Agency Hall of Fame, where he is credited for "helping the military overcome doubts as to whether or not DMA could meet their needs." His military decorations and awards include:

- Distinguished Service Medal with oak leaf cluster
- Legion of Merit with oak leaf cluster
- Bronze Star Medal with oak leaf Cluster
- Army Commendation Ribbon with oak leaf cluster
- Asiatic–Pacific Campaign Medal
- American Campaign Medal
- American Defense Service Medal
- World War II Victory Medal
- Army Occupation Medal (Japan)
- Philippine Liberation Ribbon
- National Defense Service Medal
- Armed Forces Expeditionary Medal
- Republic of Vietnam Service Medal
- Vietnamese Service Medal
- General Staff Identification Badge
- Supreme Headquarters Allied Powers Europe Badge
