= Biff (Unix) =

biff is a mail notification system for Unix.

== Usage ==
When a new mail message is delivered, the program biff alerts the recipient so they can read it immediately. The alert is sent to the tty where the recipient is logged in, and contains the Subject, From line, and first few lines of the body of the new message. The alert also includes terminal beeps to guarantee quick attention.

Notification is enabled by the command

biff y

and disabled by

biff n

== Comsat ==
The biff utility was the user interface used to change notification preferences. The actual act of notifying the user was performed by a daemon called comsat (short for "communications satellite"). The comsat daemon received messages via UDP describing the update to the mailbox, and would then inform the user of the new message.

== Replacements ==
Because the sudden, unexpected printing of a block of text on a tty can be annoying if it overwrites more useful information on the screen that can't be easily regenerated, biff is not used very much any more. Some modern MTAs do not even support comsat (the server process which listens for reports of incoming mail) making biff useless.

The general idea of the incoming mail alert has remained very popular even as the original biff and comsat have been almost completely abandoned. There are many biff replacements, several with similar names like xbiff, xlbiff, cwbiff, kbiff, gnubiff, wmbiff, imapbiff and xbuffy. The concept also extends outside the Unix world — the AOL "You've got mail" voice could be seen as a talking biff.

== Variant ==
Some versions of biff, such as the one found in FreeBSD as of 4.7 have a third mode of operation. In addition to y and n it could be set to b which would reduce the alert to just a pair of beeps, without any text written to the terminal. This makes biff less disruptive.

== Origin and name ==
biff was written by John Foderero for 4.0BSD. It was named after a dog belonging to Heidi Stettner, another Berkeley CS student; the dog was well known to many students as he would accompany Stettner around campus.

Eric Cooper, a student contemporary to Foderero and Stettner, reports that the dog would bark at the mail carrier, making it a natural choice for the name of a mail notification system. Stettner herself contradicts this.
