= COMSAT Mobile Communications =

American telecommunications company

COMSAT Mobile Communications (CMC) is an American telecommunications company which provides global mobile communications solutions to the maritime, land mobile and aeronautical communities, and offers data, voice, fax, telex and video capabilities via the Inmarsat geosynchronous satellite constellation through two earth station facilities in Southbury, Connecticut, and Santa Paula, California. CMC was a business unit of COMSAT Corporation of Bethesda, MD (NYSE: CQ) (delisted).

== Services ==
Together with COMSAT General Corporation's (another business unit of COMSAT Corp) MARISAT system, CMC provided a method of medium- and long-distance maritime ship-to-shore communication, augmenting and eventually replacing high-power radiotelegraph and radiotelephone equipment with solid state, user-friendly satellite terminals which required relatively minimal training to use in voice, fax, and telex modes that were impervious to normal radio propagation conditions and unaffected by distance, although initial rates were high ($10 per minute for voice/fax to/from the USA).

CMC services included Mobile Packet Data Service (MPDS), which provided remote users with IP capability over satellite for portable and reliable communications for Internet applications such as World Wide Web access, file transfer and e-mail.

== History ==
Acquired by Lockheed Martin Global Telecommunications (LGMT) (a subsidiary of Lockheed Martin) as part of an August 2000 merger with its parent COMSAT Corporation, the COMSAT Mobile Communications unit was purchased from LGMT by Telenor of Norway on 11 January 2002.

== See also ==
- Inmarsat, British satellite communications company
- Global Maritime Distress and Safety System
- Maritime transport § Other departments
