= Forensic software engineering =

Software engineering discipline

Forensic software engineering refers to the discipline of analyzing (and sometimes reconstructing) the functionality of software applications or services that have become defunct; are no longer accompanied by, or previously lacked, documentation; or for which the original engineers are no longer available.

== Description ==
Usually, forensic software engineering is performed with an interest in understanding the functionality - and sometimes intent - of software that has been abandoned by its creators, with an eye to correcting unexpected outcomes or determining whether to port, rebuild, replace, or retire a functional software instance.

Is often required as a result of a corporate mergers or acquisitions, or during the migration/transition from an old datacenter to a newer one.

== See also ==
- Charles Babbage Institute
- History of operating systems
- IT History Society
- List of operating systems
- Timeline of operating systems
