= NRO Program A =

National Reconnaissance Office component

The United States' National Reconnaissance Office's Program A was a component of the National Reconnaissance Program (NRP) established on 26 July 1962. Program A took the remnants of the Air Force Office of Special Projects (the successor to the ill-fated SAMOS program office, and redesignated it and refocused its efforts onto the next generation of imagery intelligence gathering satellites (i.e. CORONA/Discoverer, KH-7/8 GAMBIT, KH-9 HEXAGON, JUMPSEAT). It was disestablished 31 December 1992 when it was superseded by NRO's functional directorates.

== See also ==
- National Reconnaissance Office (NRO)
- Program B - NRO efforts run by the Central Intelligence Agency (CIA)
- Program C - NRO signals intelligences satellite efforts run by the United States Navy
- Program D - NRO air reconnaissance efforts run by the United States Air Force
