= Persistent programming language =

Programming languages that natively and seamlessly allow objects to continue existing after the program has been closed down are called persistent programming languages. JADE is one such language.

A persistent programming language is a programming language extended with constructs to handle persistent data. It is distinguished from embedded SQL in at least two ways:

In a persistent programming language:

- The query language is fully integrated with the host language and both share the same type system.
- Any format changes required between the host language and the database are carried out transparently.

In Embedded SQL:

- Where the host language and data manipulation language have different type systems, code conversion operates outside of the OO type system, and hence has a higher chance of having undetected errors.
- Format conversion must be handled explicitly and takes a substantial amount of code.

Using Embedded SQL, a programmer is responsible for writing explicit code to fetch data into memory or store data back to the database. In a persistent programming language, a programmer can manipulate persistent data without having to write such code explicitly.

The drawbacks of persistent programming languages include:

- While they are powerful, it is easy to make programming errors that damage the database.
- It is harder to do automatic high-level optimization.
- They do not support declarative querying well.

== Examples ==
- MUMPS
- JADE
- Caché ObjectScript

== See also ==
- Object–relational mapping
- Object-oriented database management systems
- Object prevalence
- Phantom OS – persistent OS project
