= Edward A. Wilkinson =

US Navy rear admiral (1933–2020)

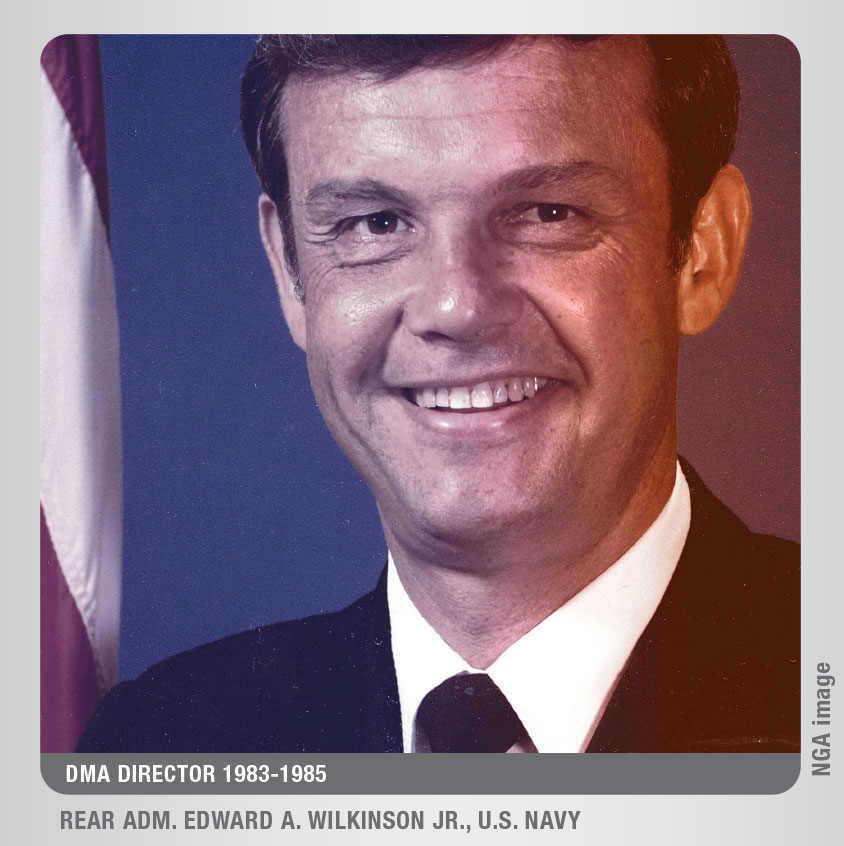
- Official portrait of Edward A. Wilkinson
- Born: Edward Anderson Wilkinson Jr. September 21, 1933; Selma, Alabama, US
- Died: May 23, 2020 (aged 86) Perdido Beach, Alabama, US
- Allegiance: United States of America
- Branch: United States Navy
- Rank: Rear Admiral

Rear Admiral Edward Anderson Wilkinson Jr. (September 21, 1933 – May 23, 2020) of United States Navy was the Director Defense Mapping Agency from July 1983 to July 1985. He was also the deputy director of Defense Mapping Agency from July 1979 to May 1981.

== Early life, and education ==
Rear Admiral Edward A. Wilkinson was born on September 21, 1933, in Selma, Alabama. He graduated from the United States Naval Academy in 1955 and earned his wings as a naval aviator the following year. He received an MS in engineering from George Washington University in 1963, and graduated from the Armed Forces Staff College in 1969, and National War College in 1973.

== Early career ==
Some highlights of Wilkinson's early career include:

- His first duty was a three-year tour in hurricane reconnaissance aircraft. He then served as Project Mercury recovery officer with Patrol Squadron 5 and as an aide to the commander of Fleet Air in Hawaii. After a tour at the Potomac River Command in Washington, DC, he served as an instructor in thermodynamics at the U.S. Naval Academy.
- After duty with Patrol Squadron 30 and Patrol Squadron 24, he became commanding officer of Patrol Squadron 8 in March 1971 and then special projects officer for Commander Fleet Air Wing Atlantic.
- Following a tour as commanding officer Patrol Squadron 30, he spent two years as P-3 program coordinator in the office of the Deputy Chief of Naval Operations for Air Warfare. For the next two years, he commanded Patrol Wing 5 and then served as deputy and then acting director of the Anti-Submarine Warfare Systems Project at the Naval Material Command until 1980.
- From 1981 to 1983, he served as commander of Atlantic Fleet patrol aircraft.

== Defense Mapping Agency ==
Rear Admiral Edward A. Wilkinson was deputy director of Defense Mapping Agency from July 1979 to May 1981.

As DMA director between 1983 and 1985, under his leadership the agency implemented the Digital Production System, an ambitious modernization program which sought to redesign and retool its MC&G production systems and processes. During Wilkinson's tenure, DMA – a heritage organization of the National Geospatial-Intelligence Agency – implemented Phase I (Mark 85) of the program on time and in budget.

Mark 85 improved and enhanced hardcopy production methods, improved production management and database management, and provided an initial softcopy production capability. Mark 85 capability allowed DMA to continue to produce critical geographic products to U.S. military forces from new digital national reconnaissance imagery.

== Accolades ==
Rear Admiral Wilkinson's military decorations and awards include:

- Defense Distinguished Service Medal
- Defense Superior Service Medal
- Legion of Merit with one gold star in lieu of second award
- Navy Commendation Medal with one gold star in lieu of second award
- Three awards of the Meritorious Unit Commendation: Patrol Squadron 24, Patrol Squadron 30, and Patrol Squadron 8.

== Death ==
Wilkinson died at his home in Perdido Beach, Alabama at the age of 86.
