= COMSAT =

Former U.S. telecommunications company

Communications Satellite Corporation
- Industry: Telecommunications
- Founded: 1962; 64 years ago
- Founder: United States Congress by Communications Satellite Act of 1962
- Headquarters: Washington, D.C., United States
- Key people: Leo D. Welch, Joseph V. Charyk, David M. Kennedy, George Killion, Leonard H. Marks and Bruce Sundlun
- Products: Communications satellite

Communications Satellite Corporation (COMSAT) is a global telecommunications company based in the United States.

By 2007, it had branches in Brazil, Argentina, Colombia, Mexico, Peru, Venezuela and several other countries in the Americas. Although it operated many kinds of data communication technologies, it is best known for its satellite communication services.

== History ==
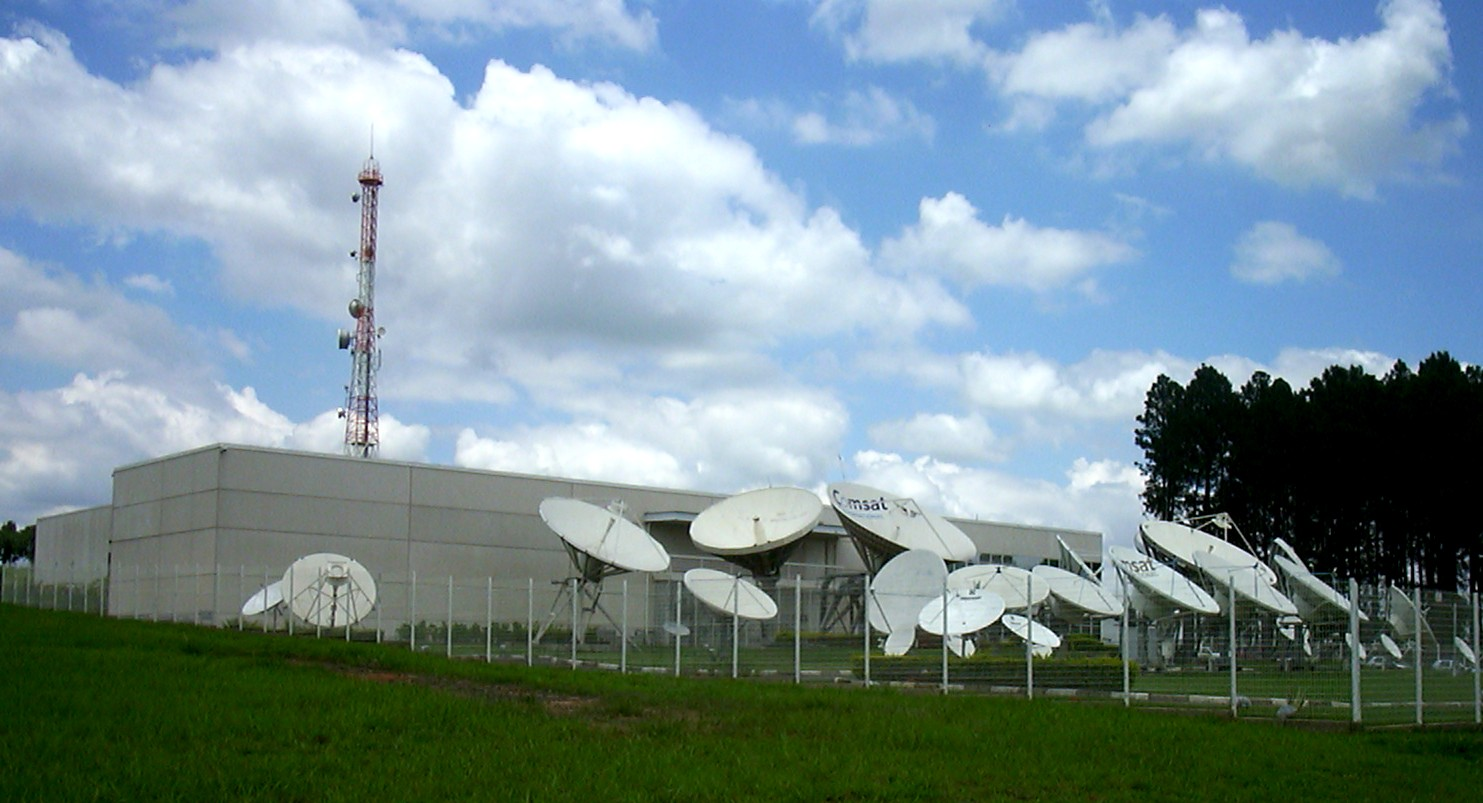
Outside view of COMSAT facilities and antenna farm near Campinas, São Paulo, Brazil

COMSAT Corporation was created by the Communications Satellite Act of 1962 and incorporated as a publicly traded company on February 1, 1963. The primary goal of COMSAT was to serve as a public, federally funded corporation intended to develop a commercial and international satellite communication system. Although the corporation was government regulated, it was equally owned by some major communications corporations and independent investors. COMSAT began operations with its headquarters in Washington, D.C., in 1962, with a six-person founding board of directors appointed by President John F. Kennedy, including: Phil Graham who served as Chairman (until his resignation in January 1963); Leo D. Welch, Joseph V. Charyk, David M. Kennedy, George Killion, Leonard H. Marks, and Bruce Sundlun.

In August 1964, COMSAT helped create the International Telecommunications Satellite Consortium (Intelsat), an international satellite organization with the goal of global satellite coverage that today has 143 member countries and signatories. COMSAT was responsible for the launching of the Early Bird communications satellite, on 6 April 1965.

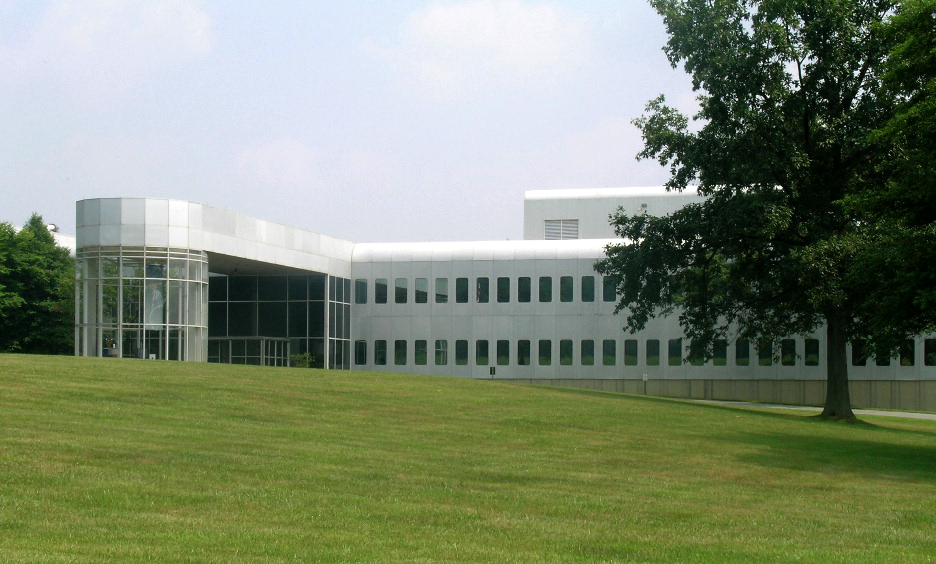
COMSAT Laboratories, Clarksburg, Maryland

To further satellite technology, in September 1969, COMSAT opened COMSAT Laboratories, a research, and development arm, in Clarksburg, Maryland. The founding director of COMSAT Labs was Bill Pritchard from 1969 to 1973. He was followed by Burton Edelson, director from 1973 to 1982. Director from 1982 to 1995 Dr. John V. Evans, Dr. Ramesh K. Gupta, director from 1995 to 2000.

Following many open inquiries into ongoing disagreements with major broadcasting companies and COMSAT, the FCC created the Open Skies Policy in June 1972. This policy authorized the use of satellites for domestic broadcast use and encouraged competition between different systems. In 1976, COMSAT deployed Marisat, three geosynchronous satellite systems providing mobile services to the United States Navy and other maritime customers, and Comstar, a domestic satellite system. To separate these activities from its Intelsat business as required by the Federal Communications Commission, a subsidiary company named Comsat General was formed. In 1982, the Marisat satellites, along with three Marisat Earth stations (two in the US — Southbury, Connecticut, and Santa Paula, California — and one in Japan) formed the initial operating system for the International Maritime Satellite Organization (INMARSAT).

COMSAT provided 2-way communication via geostationary satellite for a number of cruise ships in Caribbean and other offshore applications. The ship on-board system included an antenna stabilized with 3-axis gimbals, beacon signal receiver and an active control system to search and lock the antenna on the satellite during the ship maneuvers and severe waves. The system called Startrack was developed by the Canadian company Techwest Data Systems. In 1995, the system was acquired by the UK Marine Data Systems for their floating rigs operations in the North Sea and in 1996 manufacturing moved to Aberdeen, Scotland.

Between 1998 and 2000, COMSAT merged with Lockheed Martin Corp. In a US$2.7 billion merger, to become an element of the subsidiary Lockeed Martin Global Telecommunications (LMGT). COMSAT's ticker symbol CQ was removed from the New York Stock Exchange on 2 August 2000.

During the two-year approval process, Comsat shareholders lost about US$300 million in purchase value because of a drop in Lockheed Martin stock as the two companies struggled through complex congressional and regulatory hurdles.

With the integration of COMSAT, LMGT became the U.S. owner, and the largest shareholder, in both the INTELSAT and INMARSAT systems. INMARSAT was fully privatized on April 15, 1999. Comsat serves as the U.S. Signatory to INTELSAT, and will continue in that role until INTELSAT's expected privatization in 2001 at which point it will become a shareholder.

On 27 March 2001, LMGT announced the sale of the COMSAT mobile communications unit, which had been aligned with the satellite services business, to Telenor of Norway for US$116.5 million. This sale was completed on 11 January 2002, and included COMSAT mobile's two Earth station facilities, one in Southbury, Connecticut, and one in Santa Paula, California.

Viasat, Inc. acquired COMSAT Laboratories from Lockheed Martin in 2001.

On 7 December 2001, Lockheed Martin announced plans to exit its Global Telecommunications services business, disbanding the wholly owned LMGT subsidiary and immediately implementing actions to reassign certain of LMGT's businesses and investments to other operating segments of Lockheed Martin, sell the remaining operations, position investments for monetization, and eliminate the LMGT administrative structure. The COMSAT General telecommunications unit was realigned with the Space Systems business area.

COMSAT International Holdings (CIH), formerly known as World Data Consortium, acquired an 81% of COMSAT International (formerly Enterprise Solutions-International, a provider of network services to the South American corporate market) from Lockheed Martin Corporation in the 2nd quarter of 2002.

On 11 May 2004, Lockheed Martin announced that Intelsat, Ltd. would acquire Lockheed Martin's COMSAT General business for US$90 million. At that time, COMSAT General provided satellite-centric telecommunications services and equipment, concentrating on international fixed and mobile satellite systems.

In the 2nd quarter of 2007, BT Group of the United Kingdom announced the acquisition of COMSAT International from CIH, and Lockheed Martin announced the sale of its remaining 20% interest in COMSAT International.

=== Sports team ownership ===
COMSAT operated the Denver Nuggets of the National Basketball Association from 1989 to 2000 , and added to its sports portfolio by purchasing the Quebec Nordiques in 1995 and moving them to Denver as the Colorado Avalanche. The Nuggets' purchase was one of professional sports' first attempts to introduce African-Americans into ownership groups (it included Peter Bynoe, a Chicago lawyer, and business partner Bertram Lee, who held a combined 37.5% interest). COMSAT bought out its other shareholders in 1992.

After buying the Avalanche, COMSAT organized its Denver sports franchises under a separate subsidiary, Ascent Entertainment Group Inc., which went public in 1995, with COMSAT retaining an 80% controlling interest and the other 20% available on NASDAQ. The franchises took convincingly different directions in terms of on-court/ice production: the Nuggets were perennially among the worst teams in the NBA (bottoming out with an 11–71 record in 1997–98), while the Avalanche won a Stanley Cup in their first season in Colorado (1996) and five consecutive division trophies under Ascent's watch. In addition, COMSAT/Ascent were responsible for the construction of the Pepsi Center (which opened in 1999) where the two franchises play today, and costs began to put a drain on business.

In 1997, COMSAT agreed in principle to sell Ascent to Liberty Media. However, Liberty was not interested in sports ownership at the time (though it has since bought Major League Baseball's Atlanta Braves), and made the deal contingent upon Ascent selling the Avalanche and Nuggets.

After almost two years, Ascent sold the Avalanche and Nuggets to Walmart heirs Bill and Nancy Laurie for US$400 million. However, a group of Ascent shareholders sued, claiming that the sale price was several million dollars too low. Ascent then agreed to sell the Avalanche and Nuggets to Denver banking tycoon Donald Sturm for US$461 million.

However, the deal unraveled when the city of Denver insisted that Sturm promise to keep the Nuggets and Avalanche in Denver for at least 25 years before it transferred the parcel of land on which Pepsi Center stood. Sturm had bought the teams in his own name, and city officials wanted to protect taxpayers in case Sturm either died or sold the teams before the 25 years ran out. While Sturm was willing to make a long-term commitment to the city, he wasn't willing to be held responsible if he died or sold the teams. After negotiations fell apart, Liberty bought all Ascent, but kept the Nuggets and Avalanche on the market. Finally, in July 2000, the Avalanche, Nuggets and Pepsi Center were bought by real estate entrepreneur Stan Kroenke in a US$450 million deal. Kroenke is the brother-in-law of the Lauries; his wife Ann Walton Kroenke is Nancy Laurie's sister. Liberty retained only a 6.5% stake of the sports franchises. As part of the deal, Kroenke placed the teams into a trust that would ensure the teams will stay in Denver until at least 2025. After the deal, Kroenke organized his sports assets under Kroenke Sports Enterprises.

== See also ==
- COMSAT mobile communications
