= BugsXLA =

- Original author: Phil Woodward
- Release: July 15, 2004
- Stable release: 7.0.2 / November 4, 2019
- Written in: Excel VBA
- Operating system: Microsoft Windows
- Type: Statistical package
- Website: philwoodward.co.uk/bugsxla/

BugsXLA is a Microsoft Excel add-in that provides a graphical user interface for WinBUGS, OpenBUGS and JAGS, developed by Phil Woodward. BugsXLA allows a wide range of Bayesian models to be fitted to data stored in Excel using model statements similar to those used in R, SAS or Genstat. It has been used to analyse data in a variety of application areas, for example quality engineering, pharmaceutical research, organisational sciences and ecology. The primary purpose of BugsXLA is to reduce the learning curve associated with using Bayesian software. It does this by removing the need to know how to code in the BUGS language, how to create the other files needed, as well as providing reasonable default initial values and prior distributions.
