= Mike Spivey =

Mike Spivey may refer to:

- Michael Spivey (born 1960), British computer scientist
- Mike Spivey (law school administration), American administrator
- Mike Spivey (American football) (born 1954), American football player
