= Object Oberon =

- Paradigms: Imperative, structured, modular, object-oriented
- Family: Wirth Oberon
- Developer: Hanspeter Mössenböck; Josef Templ; Robert Griesemer
- First appeared: June 1989; 36 years ago
- Typing discipline: Strong, hybrid (static and dynamic)
- Scope: Lexical (static)
- Implementation language: Oberon
- Website: www.projectoberon.com

Influenced by
- Modula-2, Oberon

Influenced
- Oberon-2

Object Oberon is a programming language which is based on the language Oberon with features for object-oriented programming. Oberon-2 was essentially a redesign of Object Oberon.
