= Oberon (operating system) =

Multitasking operating system written in Oberon

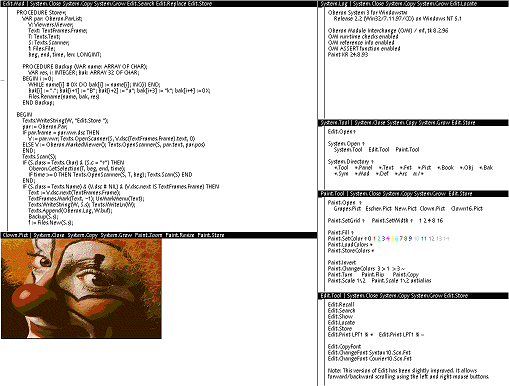
- Tiled window arrangement of Oberon
- Developer: Niklaus Wirth; Jürg Gutknecht
- Written in: Oberon
- OS family: Oberon
- Working state: Current
- Source model: Open source
- Initial release: 1987; 39 years ago
- Available in: English
- Supported platforms: Ceres (NS32032), IA-32, Xilinx Spartan, and many others
- Kernel type: Object-oriented
- Default user interface: Text-based user interface
- License: BSD-style
- Preceded by: Medos-2
- Official website: www.projectoberon.net

The Oberon System is a modular, single-user, single-process, multitasking operating system written in the programming language Oberon. It was originally developed in the late 1980s at ETH Zurich. The Oberon System has an unconventional visual text user interface (TUI) instead of a conventional command-line interface (CLI) or graphical user interface (GUI). This TUI was very innovative in its time. It influenced the design of the Acme text editor for the Plan 9 from Bell Labs operating system and bears some similarities to the "Look and feel" of the worksheet interface of the Macintosh Programmer's Workshop.

The system also evolved into the multi-process, symmetric multiprocessing (SMP) capable A2 (formerly Active Object System (AOS), then Bluebottle), with a zooming user interface (ZUI).

== History ==
The Oberon operating system originated as part of the NS32032-based Ceres workstation project. It was written almost entirely (and in the 2013 version entirely is valid) in the Oberon programming language. The basic system was designed and implemented by Niklaus Wirth and Jürg Gutknecht and its design and implementation is fully documented in their book "Project Oberon". The user Interface and programmers reference is found in Martin Reiser's book "The Oberon System". The Oberon System was later extended and ported to other hardware platforms by a team at ETH Zurich and there was recognition in popular magazines. Wirth and Gutknecht (although being active computer science professors) refer to themselves as 'part-time programmers' in the book Project Oberon. In late 2013, a few months before his 80th birthday, Wirth published a second edition of Project Oberon. It details implementing the Oberon System using a reduced instruction set computer (RISC) CPU of his own design realized on a Xilinx field-programmable gate array (FPGA) board. It was presented at the symposium organized for his 80th birthday at ETH Zurich. In the meantime, several emulators for this version were implemented.

According to Josef Templ, a former member of the developer group at Swiss Federal Institute of Technology in Zurich and later member of the Institut für Systemsoftware of Johannes Kepler University Linz, where one forked version (V4) was maintained, the genealogy of the different versions of the Oberon System is this:

Year	Name		Remark
1985			Start of Oberon project
1987	V1		Internal use at ETHZ; simple text editing facilities only
1991	V2		Extensible text model and a special editor named Write supporting these extensions
1991		System 3	Kernel extensions supporting persistent objects and object-libraries supporting object embedding and object linking; Gadgets, Script (text editor), Illustrate (graphics editor)
1992			Publication of Oberon Trilogy: "Project Oberon", "The Oberon System", and "Programming in Oberon"
1992	V4		Functions of Write integrated into standard text editor
		Rel. 1.4	Desktops
1993		Rel. 1.5	Generic document model
1994	V4		Hanspeter Mössenböck appointed at JKU (Linz), V4 development moves there
1995		Rel. 2.0	Document space extended to the whole internet; improved bitmap editor: Rembrandt; online tutorials
2000		ETH-Oberon	System-3 renamed ETH-Oberon
2002		AOS	Active Object System, also Active Oberon System, later renamed Bluebottle, then A2
2013	PO 2013 - V5		Re-implementation of the original Oberon System in FPGA

== User interface ==
Oberon has a text user interface (TUI), which is very different from a terminal user interface. It combines the point and click convenience of a graphical user interface (GUI) with the linguistic strength of a command-line interface (CLI) and is closely tied to the naming conventions of the Oberon language. Text appearing almost anywhere on a screen can be edited and used as command input. Commands are activated by a middle-mouse click on a text fragment of the form Module.Command (optionally followed by parameters, which are terminated by ~). A command is defined by any procedure which is exported and has an empty argument list. Parameters to the command must be defined before executing the middle click, and must be explicitly scanned and retrieved by the procedure. No checks or questions occur during command execution. This is sometimes called a non-modal user interface (UI).

== Versions and availability ==
V1 was the first usable version some time before the Oberon Trilogy was published. A major change in the text model together with the editor named Write yielded V2. As foreshadowed in the table in section History above, there was a major fork in the early 1990s: V4 vs. System 3: The group around Jürg Gutknecht introduced persistent objects and object-libraries thereby extending the kernel. The group around Hanspeter Mössenböck realized similar features by introducing active elements mapped to a special character thereby extending fonts without changing the kernel. System 3 was sometimes also named Spirit of Oberon and later renamed ETH Oberon, whereas V4 was sometimes also named Linz Oberon. Differences between V2.2 and V4 are summarized by a PostScript document found at SourceForge which was converted to PDF and uploaded to Wikipedia.

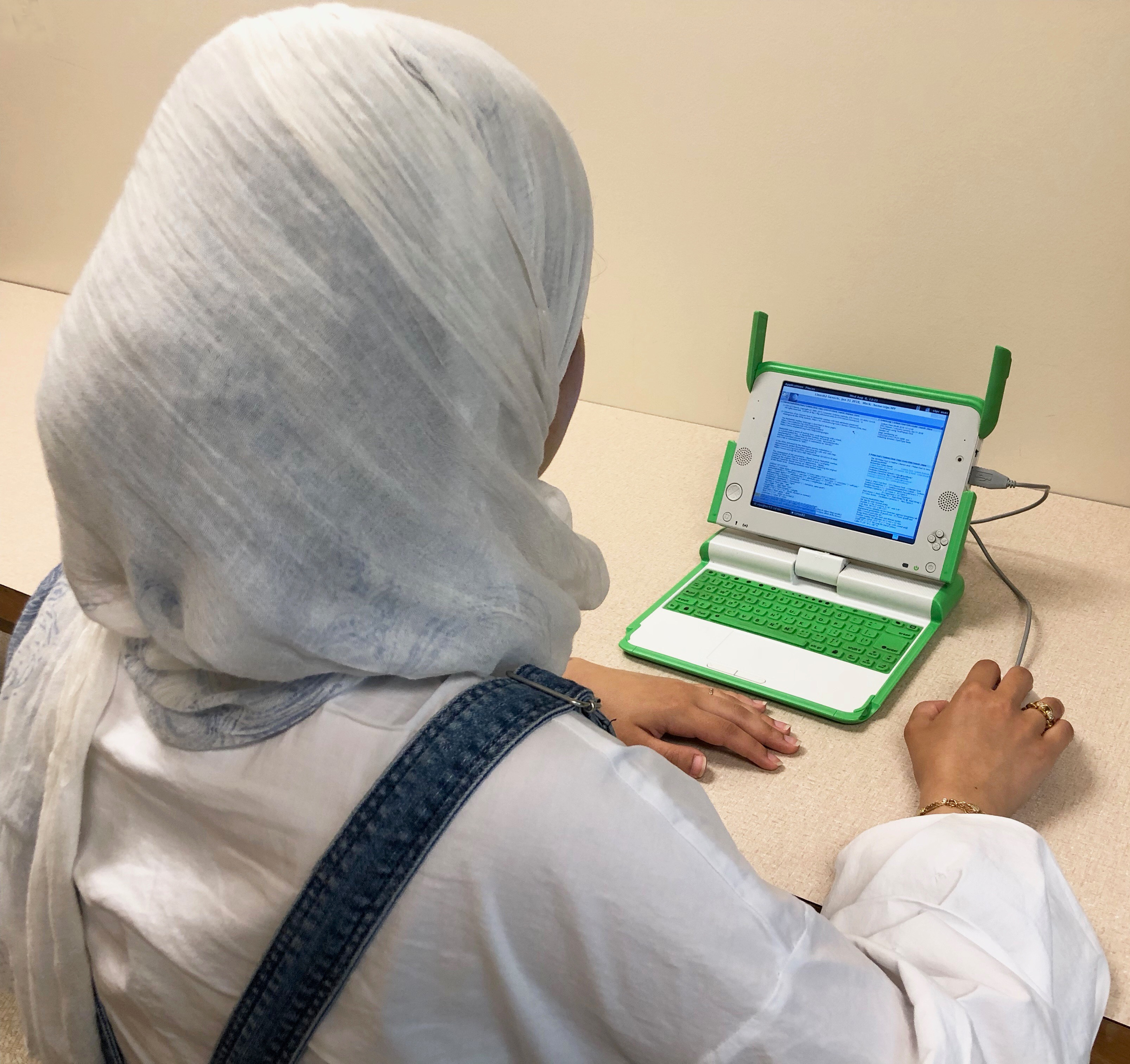
The Oberon subsystem in A2 on an XO-1.5.

As of 2017, the Oberon OS is available for several hardware computing platforms, generally in no cost versions and from several sources, which is quite confusing. The Oberon OS is typically extremely compact. Even with an Oberon compiler, assorted utilities including a web browser, TCP/IP networking, and a GUI, the full package can be compressed to one 3.5" floppy disk. There are versions which emulated the Oberon OS on another operating system and versions which run on bare hardware. The latter ones are named Native Oberon. There are native versions for the Ceres, Intel IA-32, and ARM platforms. In 2013, Niklaus Wirth adapted the basic system as described in "Project Oberon" to a current FPGA design. According to the preface of the 2013 edition, the whole system compiles in less than 10 seconds on a Spartan-3 board. This version is sometimes also named V5, despite it being much more similar functionally to the original V1 running on the Ceres than any of the later versions.

=== Plugin Oberon and slim binaries ===
A version of the Oberon System 3, which is more integrated in the Microsoft Windows OS than other implementations was named Plugin Oberon. Plugin Oberon had support for OLE, Netscape Plugins, and the binary format named Oberon Module Interchange (OMI) or slim binaries, which allowed portable object code between Intel x86, Motorola 68K, and PowerPC architectures. Slim binaries were invented by Michael Franz in the early 1990s. They were motivated and opposed to the fat binaries invented by Apple during the transition from 68k to PowerPC architectures. OMI provided portable code based on a compressed version of the abstract syntax tree. The approach of a compressed abstract syntax tree for portable code representation is revived in the Java world for GraalVM and Truffle.

=== Oberon V4 ===
The version named Oberon V4 (see also History) is closer to the original operating system developed by Wirth and Gutknecht. It was originally developed at ETHZ, but when H.P. Mössenböck went to Institut für Systemsoftware at Johannes-Kepler University in Linz (JKU), the development of V4 moved also. Thus, V4 is sometimes also called Linz-Oberon in contrast to ETH-Oberon. The most recent version of V4 and extensions are available at JKU link "Oberon from the Linz server", see also notes below. Oberon V4 appears to be orphaned, there are almost no changes since 2000. Another repository of V4 is Claudio Nieder's Oberon V4, which also shows difference between the different V4 implementations. Since 2013 this page moved to/is mirrored at SourceForge. V4 is closer to what would now be called an integrated development environment than an operating system of its own. There were many extensions written for V4, which are still available in the directory LinzTools of the zip archive of the former ftp-download area from the server of SSW at JKU. Some documentation can be found on their web-pages. The links on this page are all dead, but pointed to *.Cod files in Oberon/LinzTools directory on the ftp-server, which are mirrored in the subdirectory Oberon/Oberon/LinzTools of the previously mentioned zip-archive. More information is normally included in the packages and it is given in Oberon's special rich text format. The commands for extracting these from the ASCII formatted *.Cod files are generally present in the first lines of the *.Cod files.

=== AOS/Bluebottle/A2 ===
Around 2010, the computer science department at ETH Zurich began exploring active objects and concurrency for operating systems, and has released an early version of a new language Active Oberon and a new operating system for it, first named Active Object System (AOS) in 2002, then due to trademark issues, renamed Bluebottle in 2005, then renamed A2 in 2008. It is available from ETH Zurich with most source via the Internet. Native versions of A2 run on single- and multi-processor IA-32 and x86-64 hardware, both on bare metal and inside virtual machines. It was previously also available for the StrongARM CPU family. Versions which execute as programs under other operating systems are available on Windows (WinAos), Unix (UnixAos), Linux (LinuxAos), and macOS (DarwinAos). More detailed information about A2 is on the Russian Wikipedia pages about A2.

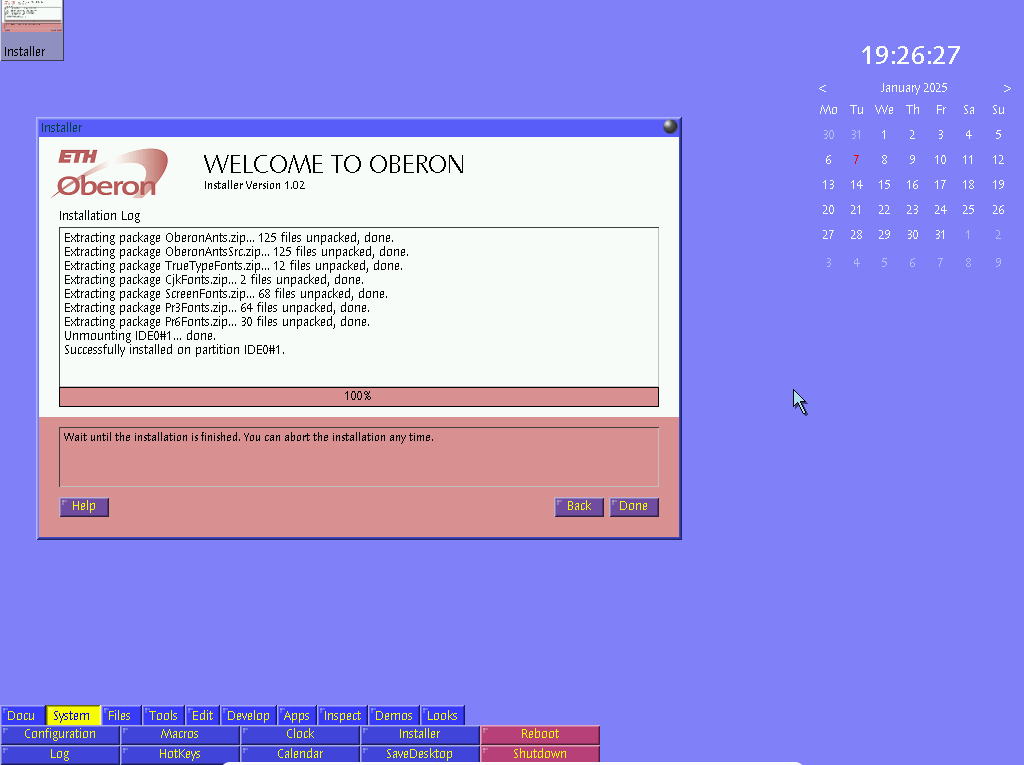
The Oberon A2 desktop screen with the installer application open, along with a calendar and clock. (Using the default style)

=== stailaOS ===
As a part of an industrial research project the Native Systems Group of ETH Zurich has developed an application-specific operating system named stailaOS which is based on the latest version Oberon OS. It is intended for uses such as real-time analytics, financial applications, main memory based enterprise resource planning (ERP), etc.

=== Native Oberon ===
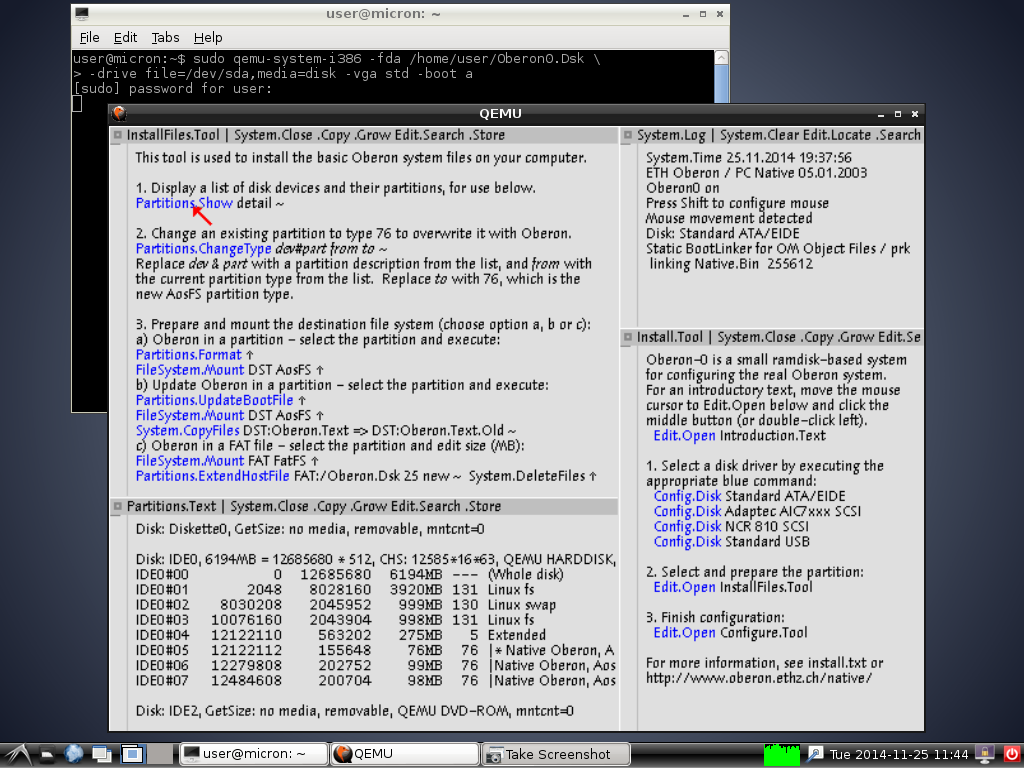
The Oberon0 installer running on QEMU in Debian Wheezy. The presentation of the partition table illustrates the comprehensibility of the system in general.

Native Oberon is an Oberon System that runs on bare hardware. PC-Native Oberon is a version that runs on IA-32 PC hardware. There has never been a V4 Native Oberon, so all information in this section implicitly assumes that it is System 3. Native Oberon has small hardware requirements: 133 MHz Pentium, 100MB hard disk, VESA 2 graphics card with resolution minimum of 1024x768 pixels, optional 3Com network card. The basic system runs from one HD floppy disk, and more software can be installed through a network. The full installation includes the Gadgets GUI. It is written fully in the language Oberon. The latest available version was 2.3.7. It is dated 5. January 2003 and sometimes also labeled as Update/Alpha, especially on the ftp-server of ETHZ. Later versions were incorporated in AOS/BlueBottle/A2.

=== LNO ===
A version named Linux Native Oberon (LNO) uses Linux as a hardware abstraction layer (HAL). Its goal is to be as compatible as possible to PC-Native Oberon. Other versions of the Oberon System, without Native in the name, had partly modified interfaces of low level modules. In 2015, Peter Matthias revitalized LNO under the name Oberon Linux Revival (OLR) as a multi-platform distribution running seamlessly on Intel x86, ARM, MIPS, and RISC-V. It runs well on the Raspberry Pi and on the low cost (discontinued) CHIP computer; with some tweaking (adjusting group membership or/and permissions on some devices) it runs well on Tiny Core Linux. OLR interfaces with Linux kernel by direct system calls. As of June 2017, OLR lacks a network layer.

=== ETHOS ===
ETHOS was an experimental object oriented version of the Oberon System created by Clemens Szyperski for his PhD Thesis

== Project Oberon 2013 ==
In 2013, Wirth and Paul Reed completed a re-implementation of the original Oberon System for the Digilent Xilinx Spartan 3 FPGA Starter Board. The work includes a revision of "Project Oberon", identified as "Project Oberon (New Edition 2013)".

In 2015, Reed collaborated with Victor Yurkovsky to create OberonStation, a Xilinx Spartan 3-based computer designed specifically to run Oberon.

The system has since been ported to a Xilinx Spartan 6 FPGA Pepino development board by Saanlima Electronics, and a Xilinx Artix 7-based Digilent Nexys A7-100 FPGA Trainer board by CFB Software.

Peter de Wachter implemented an emulator for it, which was also ported to Java and JavaScript by Michael Schierl, running in modern browsers.

== Gallery ==
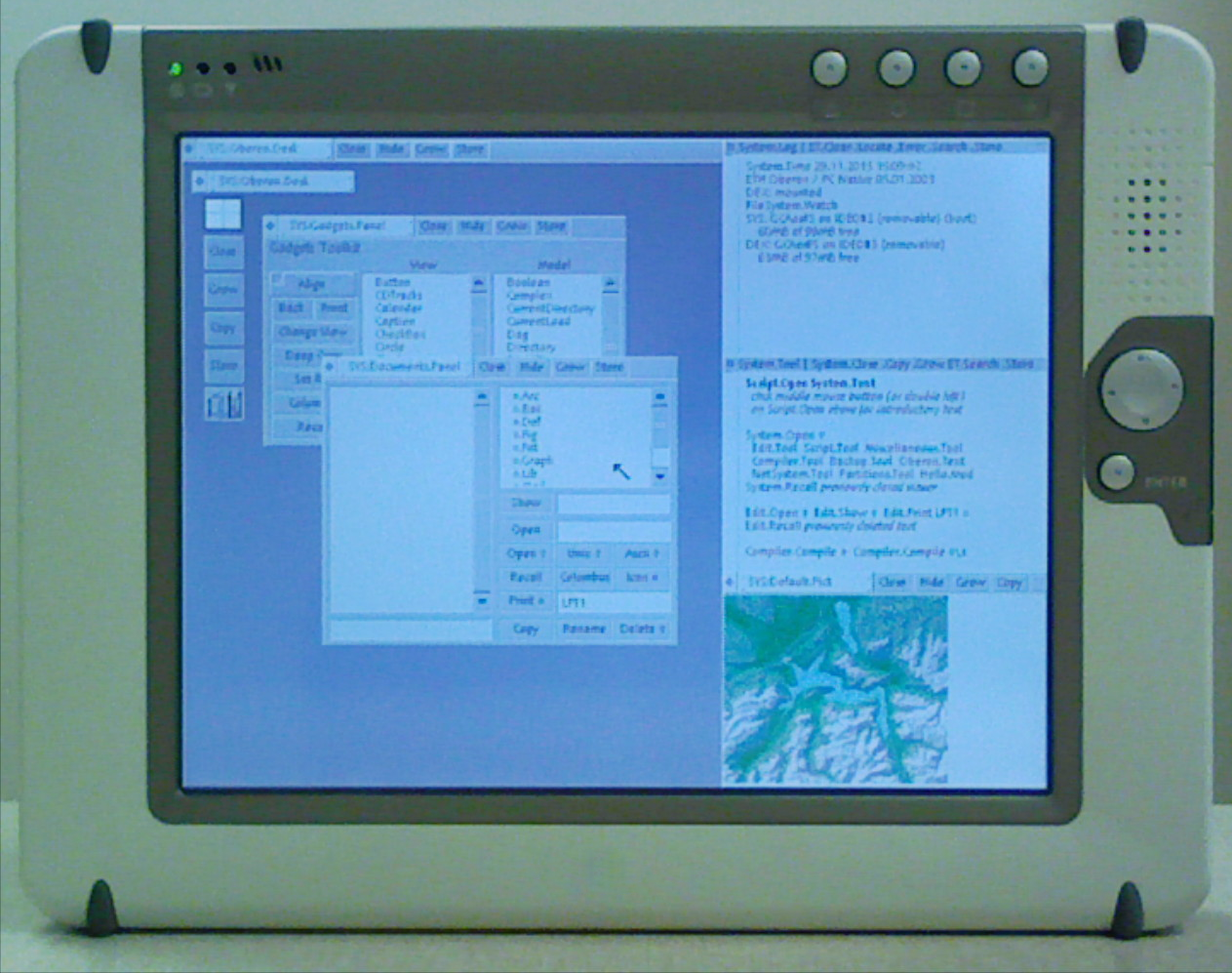
Oberon on a Tatung TWN-5213 CU tablet.

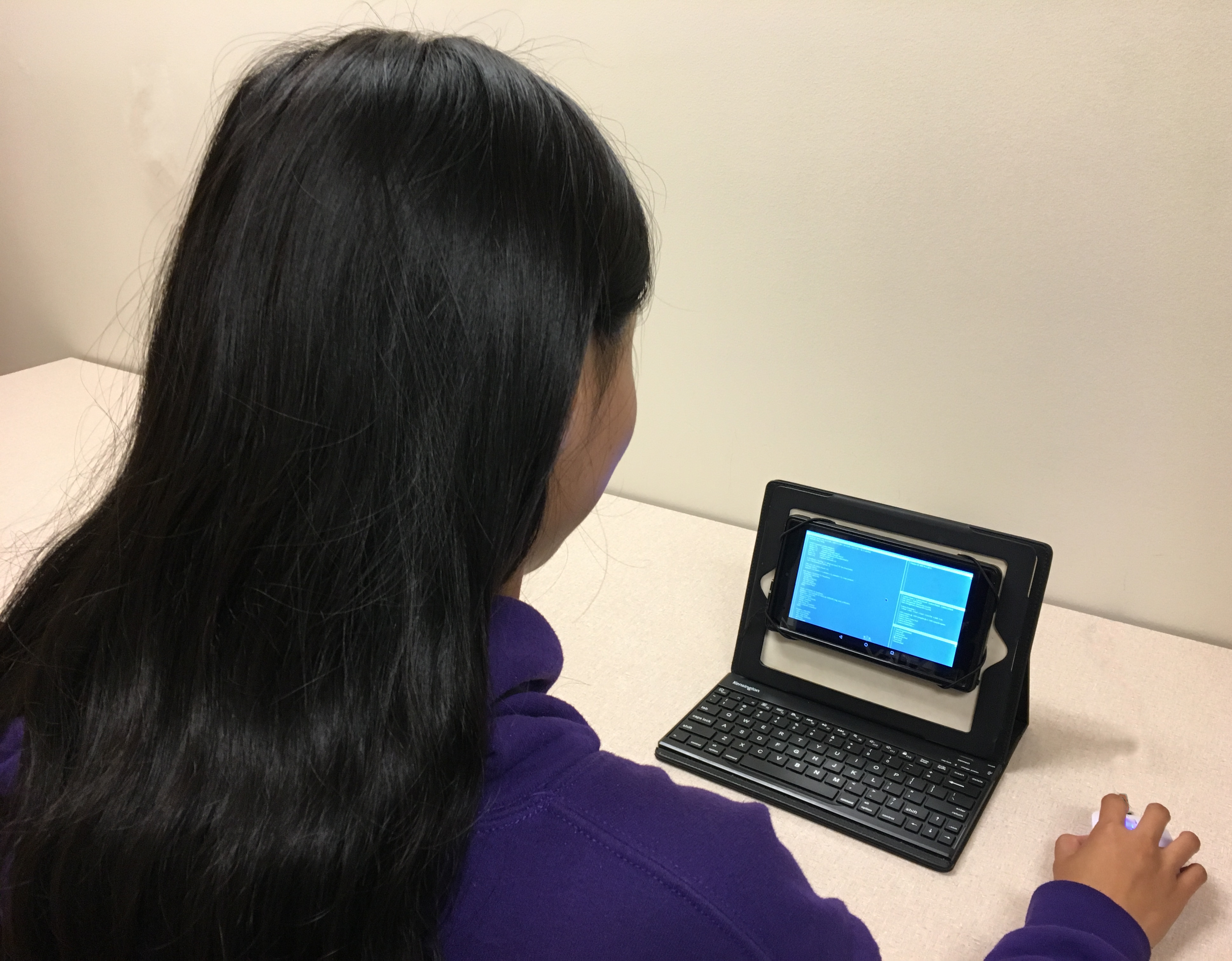
Oberon V5 RISC emulator on GNURoot Debian on Android on an Alcatel 9015B tablet with keyboard and mouse connected by Bluetooth.

== Glossary ==
- A2 – Formerly Active Object System (AOS) in 2002, renamed Bluebottle in 2005 due to rumored copyright issues, renamed A2 in 2008.
- ALO – ARM Linux Oberon; in LNO family and for ARM CPU.
- AOS – see A2 entry above.
- BB – BlackBox Component Builder. Component Pascal IDE from Oberon Microsystems.
- Bluebottle – see A2 entry above.
- CP – Component Pascal. A dialect in the Oberon family most similar to Oberon-2.
- ETHO – Oberon as developed at Swiss Federal Institute of Technology in Zurich: Eidgenössische Technische Hochschule (ETH).
- Fox – The compiler for Active Oberon, appearing in AOS (see A2 entry above).
- LEO – Linux ETH Oberon. ETHO 2.4.3 for Linux x86.
- LNO – Linux Native Oberon.
- NO – Native Oberon. Runs on bare hardware rather than on another operating system.
- OLR – Oberon Linux Revival. A version of NO which uses Linux as a HAL and runs on x86, ARM, and MIPS.
- OP2 – The Portable Oberon-2 Compiler. OP2 was developed to port Oberon onto commercially available platforms.
- PACO – (scope) PArallel COmpiler. Appears in A2 (see entry above). Compiles each scope in an independent thread.
- PIO - Programming in Oberon.
- RISC5 – the central processing unit (CPU) of Project Oberon 2013 based on Wirth's RISC architecture. Not to be confused with RISC-V.
- UnixAOS – Unix-based AOS, see A2 entry above.
- WinAOS – Windows-based AOS, see A2 entry above.

== See also ==
- Oberon Wikibook
- A2 (operating system)
- Oberon (programming language)
- Oberon-2 programming language
