= Just another Gibbs sampler =

Statistical simulation software

JAGS
- Original author: Martyn Plummer
- Initial release: December 11, 2007
- Stable release: 4.3.2 / 4 March 2023; 2 years ago
- Repository: sourceforge.net/p/mcmc-jags/code-0/ci/default/tree/
- Written in: C++
- Operating system: Unix-like, Microsoft Windows, Mac OS X
- Platform: Intel x86 - 32-bit, x64
- Size: 1.7 MB
- Type: Statistical package
- License: GNU General Public License
- Website: mcmc-jags.sourceforge.net

Just another Gibbs sampler (JAGS) is a program for simulation from Bayesian hierarchical models using Markov chain Monte Carlo (MCMC), developed by Martyn Plummer. JAGS has been employed for statistical work in many fields, for example ecology, management, and genetics.

JAGS aims for compatibility with WinBUGS/OpenBUGS through the use of a dialect of the same modeling language (informally, BUGS), but it provides no GUI for model building and MCMC sample postprocessing, which must therefore be treated in a separate program (for example calling JAGS from R through a library such as rjags and post-processing MCMC output in R).

The main advantage of JAGS in comparison to the members of the original BUGS family (WinBUGS and OpenBUGS) is its platform independence. It is written in C++, while the BUGS family is written in Component Pascal, a less widely known programming language. In addition, JAGS is already part of many repositories of Linux distributions such as Ubuntu. It can also be compiled as a 64-bit application on 64-bit platforms, thus making all the addressable space available to BUGS models.

JAGS can be used via the command line or run in batch mode through script files. This means that there is no need to redo the settings with every run and that the program can be called and controlled from within another program (e.g. from R via rjags as outlined above).

JAGS is licensed under the GNU General Public License.

== See also ==
- Stan (software)
