= Robert Griesemer =

Computer programmer and co-creator of Go

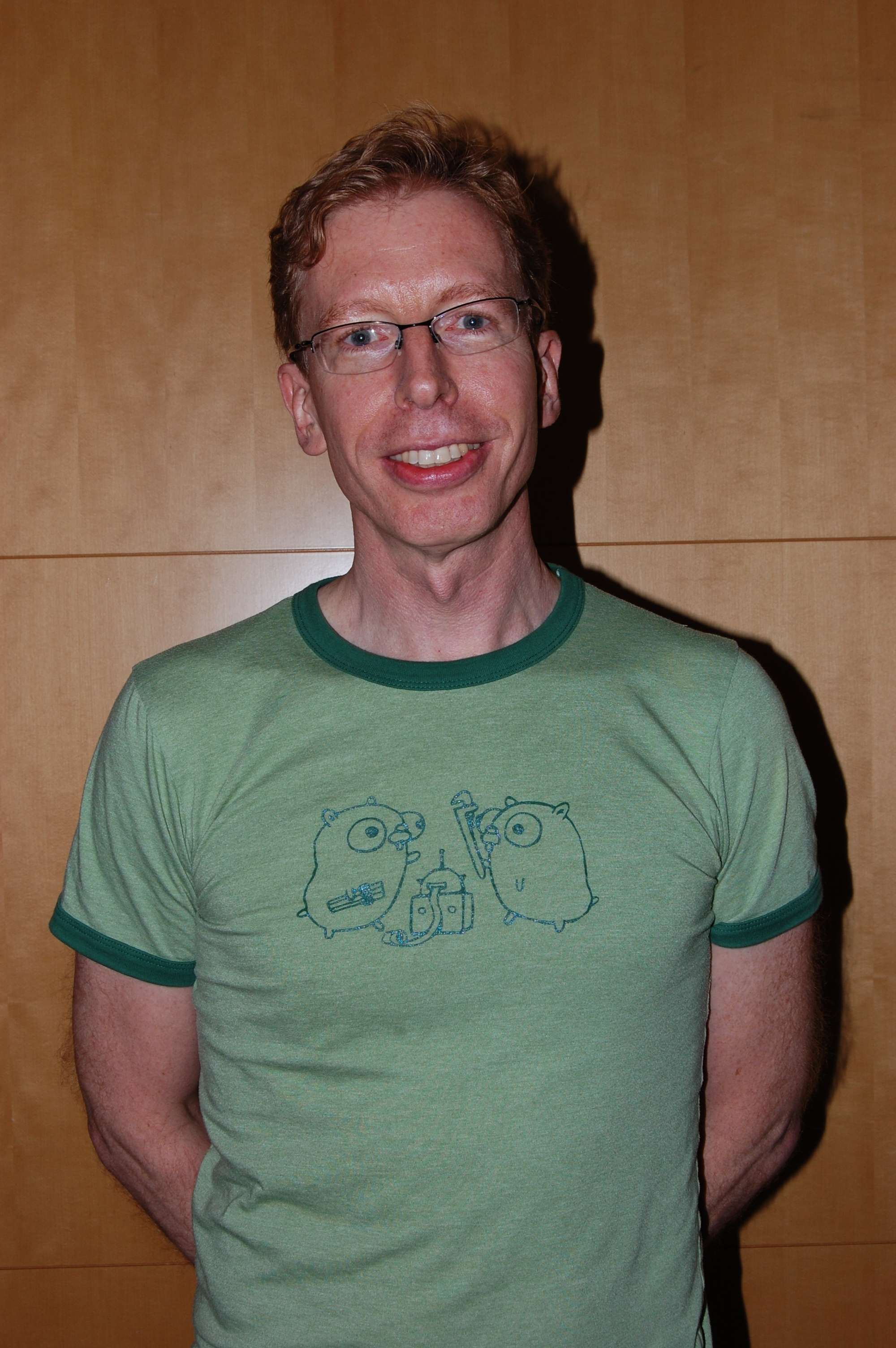
- Griesemer in 2012 (at age 47–48)
- Born: 1964 (age 61–62)
- Occupation: Software engineer
- Employer: Google
- Known for: Go

Robert Griesemer (born 1964) is a Swiss computer scientist. He is best known for his work on the Go programming language. Prior to Go, he worked on Google's V8 JavaScript engine, the Sawzall language, the Java HotSpot virtual machine, the Strongtalk system, and Object Oberon.

== Background ==
Robert Griesemer studied at the ETH Zurich, where he did his doctorate under the supervision of Hanspeter Mössenböck and Niklaus Wirth on the subject of a programming language for vector computers. He works at Google.

== Papers ==
- Robert Griesemer, Srdjan Mitrovic, A Compiler for the Java HotSpot Virtual Machine, The School of Niklaus Wirth (2000), pp. 133–152
- Tushar Deepak Chandra, Robert Griesemer, Joshua Redstone, Paxos Made Live - An Engineering Perspective (2006 Invited Talk), Proceedings of the 26th Annual ACM Symposium on Principles of Distributed Computing, ACM press (2007)

== Patents ==
- Interpreting functions utilizing a hybrid of virtual and native machine instructions
- Method and apparatus for dynamically optimizing byte-coded programs
- Apparatus and method for uniformly performing comparison operations on long word operands

== See also ==
- Rob Pike
- Ken Thompson
- Brian Kernighan
