= .odc =

In computing, the .odc file-suffix may label:

- an OpenDocument chart
- an "Office Data Connection" file for accessing external data from within Microsoft Office
- a Component Pascal file
