= A2 (operating system) =

- Developer: ETH Zurich
- OS family: Oberon
- Working state: Current
- Source model: Open source
- Initial release: 2002; 24 years ago
- Repository: gitlab.inf.ethz.ch/felixf/oberon
- Supported platforms: IA-32, x86-64, ARM, Cell
- Kernel type: Object-oriented
- License: BSD-like ETH A2 License
- Official website: gitlab.inf.ethz.ch/felixf/oberon

A2 (formerly named Active Object System (AOS), and then Bluebottle) is a modular, object-oriented operating system with features including automatic garbage-collected memory management, and a zooming user interface. It was developed originally at ETH Zurich in 2002. It is free and open-source software under a BSD-like license.

== History ==
A2 is a successor to Native Oberon, the x86 PC version of Niklaus Wirth's operating system Oberon. It supports multiprocessing computers, and provides soft real-time computing operation. It is entirely written in Active Oberon.

== User interface ==
Bluebottle replaced the older Oberon OS's unique text-based user interface (TUI) with a zooming user interface (ZUI), which is similar to a conventional graphical user interface (GUI). Like Oberon, though, its user interface supports a point and click interface metaphor to execute commands directly from text, similar to clicking hyperlinks in a web browser.

== Features ==
A2's design allows developing efficient systems based on active objects which run directly on hardware, with no mediating interpreter or virtual machine. Active objects represent a combination of the traditional object-oriented programming (OOP) model of an object, combined with a thread that executes in the context of that object. In the Active Oberon implementation, an active object may include activity of its own, and of its ancestor objects.

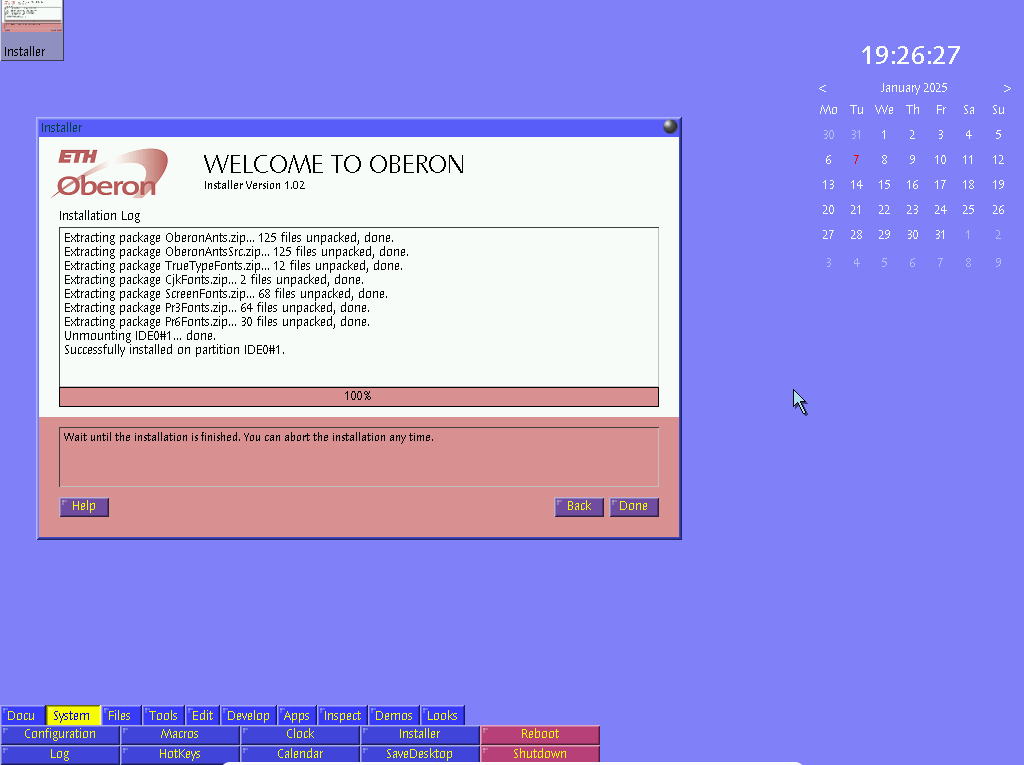
The Oberon A2 desktop screen with the installer application open, along with a calendar and clock. (Using the default style)

A2 incorporates a minimalist design, implemented in a type-safe language with automatic memory management, combined with a set of primitives (at the level of programming language and runtime system) for synchronizing access to the internal properties of objects in competing execution contexts.

Above the kernel layer, A2 provides a set of modules providing unified abstractions for devices and services, such as file systems, user interfaces, computer network connections, media codecs, etc.

== See also ==
- Active Oberon
- Oberon (operating system)
- Oberon (programming language)
- Oberon-2 programming language
- Minimalism (computing)
