= WinBUGS =

Statistical software for Bayesian analysis

- Developer: The BUGS Project
- Initial release: 1997; 28 years ago
- Final release: 1.4.3 / August 6, 2007; 18 years ago
- Written in: Component Pascal
- Operating system: Microsoft Windows
- Available in: English
- Type: Statistical package
- License: Freeware
- Website: winbugs-development.mrc-bsu.cam.ac.uk

WinBUGS is statistical software for Bayesian analysis using Markov chain Monte Carlo (MCMC) methods.

It is based on the BUGS (Bayesian inference Using Gibbs Sampling) project started in 1989. It runs under Microsoft Windows, though it can also be run on Linux or Mac using Wine.

It was developed by the BUGS Project, a team of British researchers at the MRC Biostatistics Unit, Cambridge, and Imperial College School of Medicine, London. Originally intended to solve problems encountered in medical statistics, it soon became widely used in other disciplines, such as ecology, sociology, and geology.

The last version of WinBUGS was version 1.4.3, released in August 2007. Development is now focused on OpenBUGS, an open-source version of the package. WinBUGS 1.4.3 remains available as a stable version for routine use, but is no longer being developed.
