= Michael Spivey =

British computer scientist

Michael Spivey (commonly known as Mike Spivey) is a British computer scientist at the University of Oxford.

Spivey was born in 1960 and educated at Archbishop Holgate's Grammar School in York, England. He studied mathematics at Christ's College, Cambridge and then undertook a DPhil in computer science on the Z notation at Wolfson College, Oxford and the Programming Research Group, part of the Oxford University Computing Laboratory.

Mike Spivey is a University Lecturer in Computation at the Oxford University Department of Computer Science and Misys and Anderson Fellow of Computer Science at Oriel College, Oxford. His main areas of research interest are compilers and programming languages, especially logic programming. He wrote an Oberon-2 compiler.

== Publications ==
- Understanding Z: A Specification Language and its Formal Semantics, Cambridge University Press, Cambridge Tracts in Theoretical Computer Science, No. 3, 2008. ISBN 978-0-521-05414-0.
- The Z Notation: A reference manual, Prentice Hall International Series in Computer Science, 1992. ISBN 0-13-978529-9.
- An introduction to logic programming through Prolog, Prentice Hall International Series in Computer Science, 1996. ISBN 0-13-536047-1.
