= Mike Spivey (law school administration) =

American legal academic

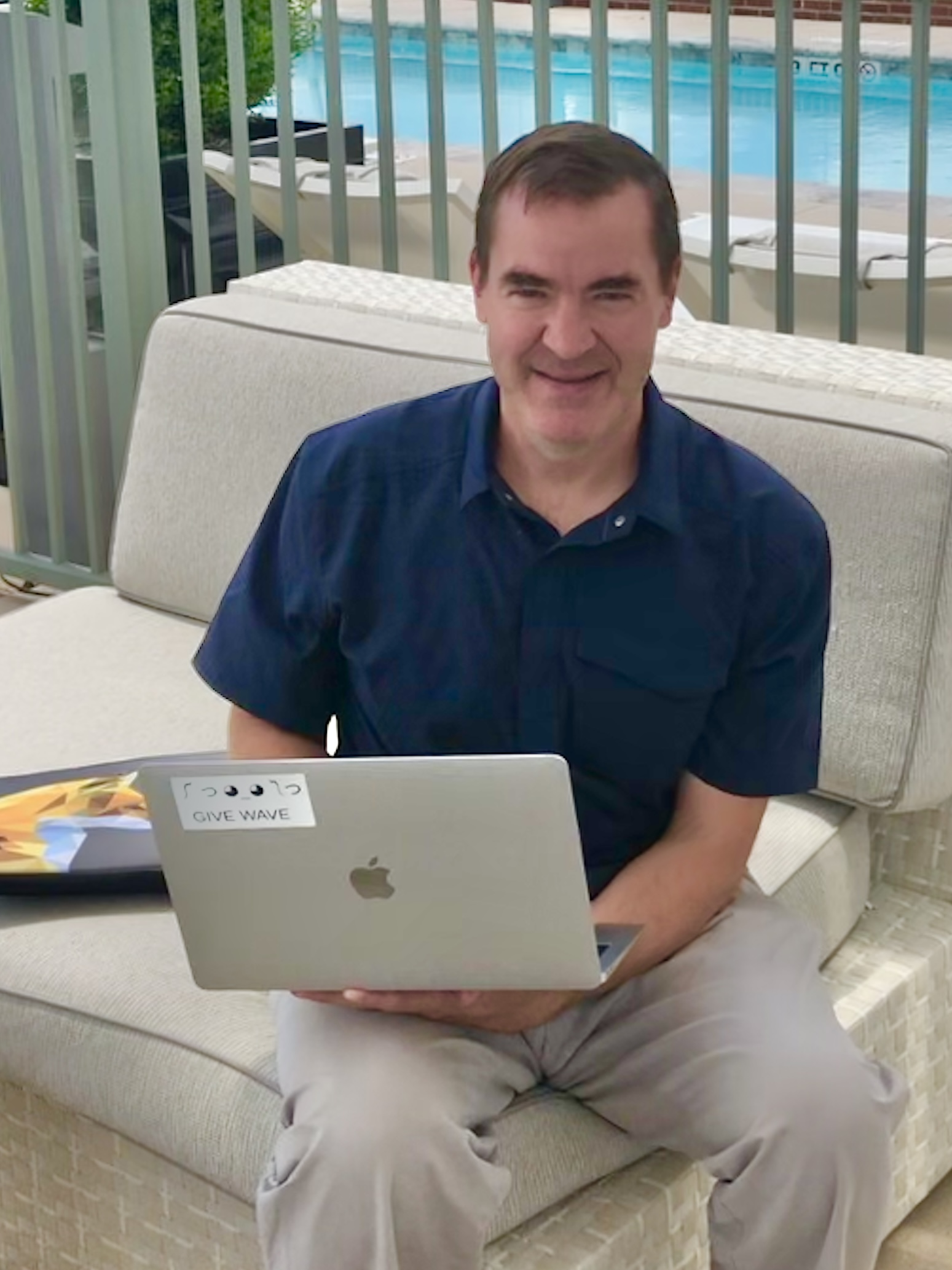
- Born: 1972 (age 53–54); New Canaan, CT
- Education: Vanderbilt University (B.A.) University of Alabama (M.B.A.)
- Known for: Higher Education Leadership

Mike Spivey is an author, podcaster, and the founder of The Spivey Consulting Group, and he has been featured as an expert on law school admissions and higher education in media outlets including The New York Times, Bloomberg Law, The Washington Post, Reuters, The Economist, Fortune, Investopedia, Newsweek, USA Today, Business Insider, Inside Higher Ed, the ABA Journal, The Chronicle of Higher Education, U.S. News & World Report, Above the Law, and Law.com.

He is a former senior-level administrator at Vanderbilt, Washington University in St. Louis, and the University of Colorado law schools. He is a co-author of The PowerScore/Spivey Consulting Law School Admissions Bible.

Spivey has been featured as a speaker at colleges and universities, including presenting with Civil Rights Leader Representative John Lewis and Wikipedia co-founder Jimmy Wales at the University of Alabama. He hosts a podcast, "Status Check with Spivey."

Spivey served on the board of directors for Law School Transparency and was an advisory board member for LexisNexis. He is from New Canaan, Connecticut, and resides in Boulder, Colorado.
