= TechGig =

Programming website

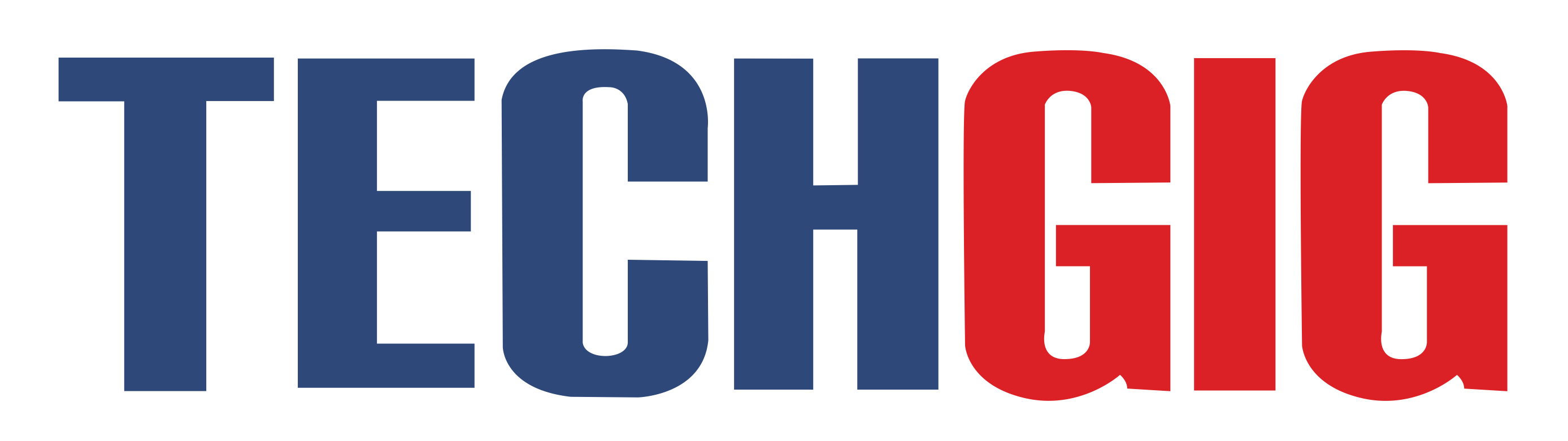
- Company type: Subsidiary
- Available in: English
- Founded: 2010; 16 years ago
- Headquarters: Gurgaon, India
- Owner: Times Internet
- Key people: Satyan Gajwani, Vice Chairman; Gautam Sinha, CEO
- Industry: Competitive programming
- Website: www.techgig.com
- Registration: Optional
- Current status: Online

TechGig is a competitive programming and technology community website owned by Times Internet.

== Overview ==
TechGig was founded in 2010 by Times Business Solutions(A Division of Times Internet) as technology community website on competitive programming, technology jobs, webinars and tech news. Programmers can take up skill tests and mock interviews in C, C++, C#, Java, .Net, MySQL, Linux, Unix, Ajax, Python, LAMP, JSON and other technologies. TechGig launched a recruitment platform where companies can hire candidates based on their test results. The usual contest formats are – coding, MCQs, skill tests, whitepapers, and business case studies. As of July 2018, it has an active community of 2.5 million developers.

== Contests ==
- Code Gladiators is an annual coding competition started in 2014 to identify the best coders in India. Themes of the 2018 contest were Artificial Intelligence, Machine Learning, Alexa, Big Data, Blockchain, Cloud Computing, E-commerce, Mobility, and Internet of Things. The total bounty for 2018 contest was INR 7.5 million.
- Geek Goddess is a coding contest for women programmers. The themes of 2018 contest were UI, IoT and Data Science with a total prize money of INR 0.75 Million.
- Virtual Campus League is an Inter–college coding contest to identify the best programmers & tech enthusiast students across India.

== Records ==
In 2017, TechGig Code Gladiators has been declared as the largest programming event by the Guinness World Records. The Guinness officials stated that TechGig had 81,641 unique submissions from programmers and the previous record was set in 2012 by Baidu which had 30,634 entrants.

The Code Gladiators competition had won the Limca Book National Record twice - for their 2015 and 2016 editions.

== See also ==
- ACES Coders
