= Hanspeter Mössenböck =

Austrian computer scientist

Hanspeter Mössenböck (born January 20, 1959, in Schwanenstadt, Austria) is an Austrian computer scientist. Until his retirement in 2025, he was a professor of Computer Science and System Software at Johannes Kepler University Linz (JKU) and led the institute for System Software.

== Life ==
From 1978 to 1983 Mössenböck studied Computer Science at JKU and did his PhD in 1987 "sub auspiciis Praesidentis" supervised by Peter Rechenberg. From 1987 to 1988 he was a postdoc at the Universität Zürich and from 1988 to 1994 an assistant professor at ETH Zürich. He worked with Niklaus Wirth on the Oberon programming language and the Oberon system. He was founder and first president of CHOOSE, the Swiss Group for Object-oriented Software Engineering of the Swiss Informatics Society (SI).

1994 Mössenböck became professor of Computer Science (System Software) at JKU. In 2000 he did a sabbatical at Sun Microsystems JavaSoft group in California. A long term research cooperation resulted, with Sun, now Oracle. From 2002 to 2025 he chaired the curriculum committee for Computer Science at JKU, from 2004 to 2025 he was the chair of the institute for System Software at JKU, from 2008 to 2018 he was a member of the university council at Graz University of Technology.

He holds an honorary doctorate from Eötvös Loránd Universität Budapest (2006) and another one from Oxford Brookes University UK (2025). From 2006 to 2013 he also led the Christian Doppler Laboratory for Automated Software Engineering at the JKU.

From 2019 to 2022 he served as the head of the academic senate at JKU, the university's highest body.

== Work and research interest ==
Mössenböcks research interests include programming languages, compilers, and automated software engineering.

In compiler construction Mössenböcks research group worked the following topics. First, dynamic compilation, with areas like static single assignment form, feedback directed optimisation, dynamic redefinition of programs. Second, they work on register allocation in compilers and ways to optimize dynamic compilation, like escape analysis, object inlining. Results of this research, e.g. register allocation, static single assignment form, escape analysis landed in Oracle's (formerly Sun's) Java compiler. Mössenböck is the author of the open source compiler generator Coco/R which is used in quite a number of universities and companies.

In the software engineering domain the research interest is on object oriented and component based systems, especially on composing software dynamically via plug-ins. Further areas of work are domain specific language and tools.

== Honours ==
- Honorary doctorate from Oxford Brookes University (2025)
- Honorary senator at Graz University of Technology (2018)
- Honorary doctorate from Eötvös Loránd University Budapest (2006)
- Teaching award from the Departement of Computer Science at ETH Zürich (1989)
- PhD with the honor of „sub auspiciis praesidentis rei publicae“ (1987)
