= System programming language =

Class of computer programming languages

A system programming language is a programming language used for system programming; such languages are designed for writing system software, which usually requires different development approaches when compared with application software. Edsger Dijkstra referred to these languages as machine oriented high order languages, or mohol.

General-purpose programming languages tend to focus on generic features to allow programs written in the language to use the same code on different computing platforms. Examples of such languages include ALGOL and Pascal. This generic quality typically comes at the cost of denying direct access to the machine's internal workings, and this often has negative effects on performance.

System languages, in contrast, are designed not for compatibility, but for performance and ease of access to the underlying computer hardware while still providing high-level programming concepts like structured programming. Examples include Executive Systems Problem Oriented Language (ESPOL) and Systems Programming Language (SPL), both of which are ALGOL-like in syntax but tuned to their respective platforms. Others are cross-platform software, but designed to work close to the hardware, like BLISS, JOVIAL, and BCPL.

Some languages straddle the system and application domains, bridging the gap between these uses. The canonical example is C, which is used widely for both system and application programming. PL/I was an early example. Some modern languages also do this such as Rust and Swift.

== Features ==
In contrast with application languages, system programming languages typically offer more-direct access to the physical hardware of the machine: an archetypical system programming language in this sense was BCPL. System programming languages often lack built-in input/output (I/O) facilities because a system-software project usually develops its own I/O mechanisms or builds on basic monitor I/O or screen management facilities. The distinction between languages used for system programming and application programming became blurred over time with the widespread popularity of PL/I, C and Pascal.

== History ==
The earliest system software was written in assembly language mostly because no alternative existed, but also for reasons including efficiency of object code, compiling time, and ease of debugging. Application languages such as FORTRAN were used for system programming, although they usually still required some routines to be written in assembly language.

=== Mid-level languages ===
Mid-level languages "have much of the syntax and facilities of a higher level language, but also provide direct access in the language (and often an assembly language) to machine features." The earliest of these was ESPOL on Burroughs mainframes in about 1960, followed by Niklaus Wirth's PL360 (first written on a Burroughs system as a cross compiler), which had the general syntax of ALGOL 60 but whose statements directly manipulated CPU registers and memory. Other languages in this category include MOL-360 and PL/S.

As an example, a typical PL360 statement is R9 := R8 and R7 shll 8 or R6, signifying that registers 8 and 7 should be and'ed together, the result shifted left 8 bits, the result of that or'ed with the contents of register 6, and the final result placed into register 9.

=== Higher-level languages ===
While PL360 is at the semantic level of assembly language, another kind of system programming language operates at a higher semantic level, but has specific extensions designed to make the language suitable for system programming. An early example of this kind of language is LRLTRAN, which extended Fortran with features for character and bit manipulation, pointers, and directly addressed jump tables.

Subsequently, languages such as C were developed, where the combination of features was sufficient to write system software, and a compiler could be developed that generated efficient object programs on modest hardware. Such a language generally omits features that cannot be implemented efficiently, and adds a small number of machine-dependent features needed to access specific hardware abilities; inline assembly code, such as C's asm statement, is often used for this purpose. Although many such languages were developed, C and C++ are the ones which survived.

== Major languages ==
Language	Originator	Birth date	Influenced by	Used for
JOVIAL	System Development Corporation	1960	ALGOL 58	Many systems, mostly military
ESPOL	Burroughs Corporation	1961	ALGOL 60	MCP
PL/I	IBM, SHARE	1964	ALGOL, FORTRAN, some COBOL	Multics, Stratus VOS. Dialects used in PRIMOS, IBM CPF, IBM OS/400.
PL/S	IBM	1960s	PL/I	OS/360 and successors
Edinburgh IMP	University of Edinburgh	1966	ALGOL 60, Atlas Autocode	Edinburgh Multiple Access System
BCPL	Martin Richards	1967	CPL	Xerox Alto Executive, TRIPOS
PL360	Niklaus Wirth	1968	ALGOL 60	ALGOL W
Pascal	Niklaus Wirth	1970	ALGOL W	Apollo AEGIS, MacApp, UCSD p-System, VAXELN, Lisa OS, PERQ OS
BLISS	Carnegie Mellon University	1970	ALGOL, PL/I	OpenVMS (portions), Hydra
Language for Systems Development (LSD or LSyD)	R. Daniel Bergeron, et al. (Brown University)	1971	PL/I	
C	Dennis Ritchie	1972	BCPL, B	Many operating system kernels, including most Unix-like systems; SQLite
System Programming Language (SPL)	Hewlett-Packard	1972	ALGOL 60, ESPOL	HP 3000 system software, including MPE
PL/M	Gary Kildall	1973	PL/I, XPL	CP/M, ISIS, iRMX
NEWP	Burroughs	1970s	ESPOL, ALGOL	MCP
PL.8	IBM	1970s	PL/I	compiler development, AIX (versions 1 and 2 only), IBM mainframe firmware
PL-6	Honeywell, Inc.	1970s	PL/I	CP-6
SYMPL	CDC	1970s	JOVIAL	NOS subsystems, most compilers, FSE editor
Transaction Application Language (TAL)	Tandem Computers	1970s	SPL, C, Pascal	NonStop OS
Mesa	Xerox PARC	1976	Pascal, ALGOL 68	Pilot, GlobalView
Modula-2	Niklaus Wirth	1978	Pascal, Mesa	Medos-2, portions of IBM OS/400 and PRIMOS. Modula-2+ variant used in ARX, Topaz.
C++	Bjarne Stroustrup	1979	C, Simula	BeOS, Haiku, Serenity OS, Symbian. Portions of IBM i, macOS, Microsoft Windows.
S3	ICL	1980s	ALGOL 68	ICL VME
Ada	Jean Ichbiah, S. Tucker Taft	1983	ALGOL 68, Pascal, C++, Eiffel	Military, aerospace mass transportation, high-integrity computation, operating system kernels, iMAX 432, BiiN/OS
Oberon	Niklaus Wirth	1987	Modula-2	Oberon System
Modula-3	DEC SRC, Olivetti	1988	Modula-2+	SPIN
D	Digital Mars	2001	C++	
Nim	Andreas Rumpf	2008	Python, Ada, Lisp, Oberon, C++, Modula-3, Object Pascal	
Go	Google	2009	Oberon, C, Pascal	Kubernetes, Docker
Rust	Mozilla Research	2010	C++, Haskell, Erlang, Ruby	Servo, RedoxOS. Portions of the Linux kernel and of Microsoft Windows.
Swift	Apple Inc.	2014	C, Objective-C, D, Rust	macOS, iOS, watchOS, and tvOS app development (Note: Swift uses Automatic Reference Counting)
Zig	Andrew Kelley	2016	C, C++, LLVM IR, Go, Rust	TigerBeetle, Mach engine, Ghostty
Mojo	Modular Inc.	2023	C, C++, Python, Rust, Swift, Zig	

== See also ==
- Ousterhout's dichotomy
- PreScheme
