= LSD (disambiguation) =

LSD is lysergic acid diethylamide, a psychedelic drug.

The initialism may also refer to:

== Film and television ==
- Love Sex aur Dhokha, a 2010 film by Dibakar Banerjee
  - Love Sex aur Dhokha 2, its 2024 sequel
- "Lysergic Acid Diethylamide" (Fringe), a 2011 episode of the American science fiction drama television series Fringe
- LSD - Love, Scandal and Doctors, Indian web series
- LSD: Laal Suitcase Ta Dekhechen?, Indian film

== Music ==
- Left Spine Down, a Canadian cyberpunk band formed in 2001
- LSD (group), a musical supergroup formed in 2018
- LSD and the Search for God, an American band formed in 2005

=== Albums ===
- LSD (Cardiacs album), 2025
- Labrinth, Sia & Diplo Present... LSD, 2019, by LSD

=== Songs ===
- "LSD" (song), a 2015 song by ASAP Rocky
- "L.S.D" (Skegss song), 2014
- "£.s.d.", a song by the Pretty Things, the B-side to the song "Come See Me", 1966
- "L.S.D.", a song by Hawkwind from the album Electric Tepee, 1992
- "LSD" (Gloria Groove song), 2022

== Organizations ==
- League of Social Democrats, a political party in Hong Kong
- League for Spiritual Discovery, organization active in the US in the mid-to-late 1960s, promoting the use and legality of LSD
- Louisiana School for the Deaf, Baton Rouge, US
- Lutheran School For The Deaf, Kwai Chung, Hong Kong

== Science and technology ==
- Language for Systems Development, a programming language
- Laser Schlieren Deflectometry, for gas temperature measurement
- Fisher's least significant difference, a post-hoc statistical test for pairwise comparisons
- Least significant digit
- Lightweight Service Discovery
- Limit state design in structural engineering
- Limited-slip differential, for vehicles
- Local Peer Discovery, or Local Service Discovery
- Line sharing device or modem sharing device
- Linear slot HVAC diffuser
- Log-spectral distance or log-spectral distortion
- Low self-discharge NiMH battery
- Low sulfur diesel, a fuel
- Lumpy skin disease of cattle
- Lysosomal storage disease, metabolic disorders

== Other uses ==
- Karolina Dean or LSD, Marvel Comics character in Runaways
- Lake Shore Drive, Chicago, U.S.
- Landing Ship, Dock, US Navy designation
- Legal subdivision in Dominion Land Survey of Western Canada
- Little Sandy Desert, a desert and bioregion in Western Australia
- "Little" Spike Dudley, American wrestler
- Long slow distance running training
- LSD: Dream Emulator, a 1998 Japanese video game
- Lsd or £sd, short for the Imperial Roman coins librae, solidii, and denarii, now used for pounds, shillings, and pence
