= Greg Nelson (computer scientist) =

American computer scientist

- Born: Charles Gregory Nelson; March 27, 1953
- Died: February 2, 2015 (aged 61)
- Education: B.A., Harvard University (1976); Ph.D., Stanford University (1980)
- Known for: Satisfiability modulo theories Extended static checking Program verification Modula-3 committee ESC/Java Simplify theorem prover
- Awards: Herbrand Award (2013)
- Scientific career
- Institutions: Xerox Palo Alto Research Center (PARC); Digital Equipment Corporation (DEC) Systems Research Center (SRC); Hewlett-Packard Labs
- Thesis: Techniques for Program Verification (1980)
- Doctoral advisor: Robert Tarjan

Charles Gregory Nelson (27 March 1953 – 2 February 2015) was an American computer scientist.

== Biography ==
Nelson grew up in Honolulu. As a boy he excelled at gymnastics and tennis. He attended the University Laboratory School. He received his B.A. degree in mathematics from Harvard University in 1976. He received his Ph.D. in computer science from Stanford University in 1980 under the supervision of Robert Tarjan. He lived in Juneau, Alaska for a year before settling permanently in the San Francisco Bay Area.

== Notable work ==
His thesis, Techniques for Program Verification, influenced both program verification and automated theorem proving, especially in the area now named satisfiability modulo theories, where he contributed techniques for combining decision procedures, as well as efficient decision procedures for quantifier-free constraints in first-order logic and term algebra. He received the Herbrand Award in 2013:

for his pioneering contributions to theorem proving and program verification, such as his seminal work with Derek Oppen on the combination of satisfiability procedures and fast congruence closure algorithms, the development of the highly influential theorem prover Simplify, and his role in the creation of the field of extended static checking.

He was instrumental in developing the Simplify theorem prover used by ESC/Java. He made significant contributions in several other areas. He contributed to the field of programming language design as a member of the Modula-3 committee. In distributed systems he contributed to Network Objects. He made pioneering contributions with his constraint-based graphics editors (Juno and Juno-2), windowing system (Trestle), optimal code generation (Denali), and multi-threaded programming (Eraser).

== See also ==
- List of computer scientists
- List of programmers
