= Mystery Mansion =

Mystery Mansion may refer to:

- Mystery Mansion a 1928 horror two reel short (film) written and directed by Harry Delf
- Mystery Mansion (video game), a late 1970s text-based adventure video game
- Mystery Mansion (film), a 1983 family movie
- Mystery Mansion (board game), a board game first offered by Milton Bradley in 1984, then updated and released by Parker Brothers as an electronic version in the 1990s
