= Digital Research Labs =

There are several companies with Digital Research Labs in their name or that are otherwise similarly named:

- Digital Research, a defunct microcomputer operating system (CP/M, DR-DOS) vendor founded by Gary Kildall
- Threshold Digital Research Labs, a digital animation studio
- DEC Systems Research Center, the research arm of Digital Equipment Corporation

== See also ==
- Digital Research Systems Group (disambiguation)
