= Modula-2+ =

Programming language

- Paradigms: imperative, structured, modular, data and procedure hiding, concurrent
- Family: Wirth Modula
- Designed by: Paul Rovner, Roy Levin, John Wick
- Developer: DEC Systems Research Center (SRC); Acorn Research Center
- First appeared: 1984; 41 years ago
- Typing discipline: Static, strong, safe
- Scope: Lexical
- OS: Cross-platform
- License: Proprietary

Major implementations
- DEC SRC Modula-2+, CAMEL (C and Modula Execution Library)

Dialects
- DEC SRC

Influenced by
- Pascal, ALGOL, Modula-2

Influenced
- Modula-3

Modula-2+ is a programming language descended from the Modula-2 language. It was developed at DEC Systems Research Center (SRC) and Acorn Computers Ltd Research Centre in Palo Alto, California. Modula-2+ is Modula-2 with exceptions and threads. The group which developed the language was led by P. Rovner in 1984.

Main differences with Modula-2:

- Concurrency; different than the concept of coroutine, which was already part of Modula-2
- Exception handling
- Garbage collection

== Implementations ==
Modula-2+ was used to develop Topaz, an operating system for the SRC DEC Firefly shared memory asymmetric multiprocessing workstation. Most Topaz applications were written in Modula-2+, which grew along with the development of the system. Modula-2+ was also used by Acorn in the ARX operating system, and to build an integrated development environment in the Acorn Research Center (ARC). Modula-2+ strongly influenced other languages such as Modula-3, but as of 2005, it had disappeared.

The original developers of Modula-2+ were both acquired: Acorn by Olivetti and Digital Equipment Corporation by Compaq. Compaq was bought by Hewlett-Packard. Olivetti sold the Olivetti Research Center and Olivetti Software Technology Laboratory (after bought Acorn ARC) to Oracle Corporation and was later absorbed by AT&T. DEC have made the SRC-reports available to the public.

== See also ==
- Modula
