= Obliq =

Interpreted, object-oriented programming language

- Paradigms: Multi-paradigm: imperative, structured, modular, object-oriented, prototype-based, parallel
- Family: Wirth Oberon
- Designed by: Krishna Bharat; Marc H. Brown; Luca Cardelli
- First appeared: 1993; 33 years ago
- Typing discipline: Strong, dynamic
- Scope: Lexical pure
- Implementation language: Modula-3
- Platform: IA-32
- Website: www.cc.gatech.edu/gvu/people/Phd/Krishna/VO/VOHome.html

Major implementations
- Obliq, Visual Obliq

Influenced by
- Modula-3, Self, Oberon

Obliq is an interpreted, object-oriented programming language designed to make distributed, and locally multithreaded, computing simpler and easier to program, while providing program safety and an implicit type system. The interpreter is written in Modula-3, and provides Obliq with full access to Modula-3's network objects capabilities. A type inference algorithm for record concatenation, subtyping, and recursive types has been developed for Obliq. Further, it has been proved to be NP-complete and its lowest complexity to be Ο(n^{3}) or if under other modeling up to certain conditions down to Ο(n^{2}) and its best known implementation runs in Ο(n^{5}). Obliq's syntax is very similar to Modula-3, the biggest difference being that Obliq has no need of explicit typed variables (i.e., a variable can hold any data type allowed by the type checker and if does not accepts one, i.e., a given expression execution error will display) although explicit type declarations are allowed and ignored by the interpreter. The basic data types in the language include booleans, integers, reals, characters, strings, and arrays. Obliq supports the usual set of sequential control structures (conditional, iteration, and exception handling forms), and special control forms for concurrency (mutexes and guarded statements). Further, Obliq's objects can be cloned and safely copied remotely by any machine in a distributed network object and it can be done safely and transparently.

Obliq's large standard library provides strong support for mathematical operations, input/output (I/O), persistence, thread control, graphics, and animation. Distributed computing is object-based: objects hold a state, which is local to one process. Scope of objects and other variables is purely lexical. Objects can call methods of other objects, even if those objects are on another machine on the network. Obliq objects are simply collections of named fields (similar to slots in Self and Smalltalk), and support inheritance by delegation (like Self).

The common uses of Obliq involve programming over networks, 3D animation, and distributed computing, as occurs over a local area network (LAN) such as Ethernet. Obliq is included free with the Digital Equipment Corporation (DEC) Modula-3 distribution, but other free versions exist elsewhere including precompiled binaries for several operating systems.

== Projects using Obliq ==
- The Collaborative Active Textbooks (CAT) developed using Obliq applets and the Zeus algorithm animation System (written in Modula-3).
- Obliq applets (Oblets) special web browser (written in Modula-3) Obliq web page embedded applications.
