= Digital Research Systems Group =

Digital Research Systems Group may refer to:

- Novell Digital Research Systems Group, a department of Novell related to Digital Research operating system development between 1991 and 1992, later merged into Novell's Desktop Systems Group (DSG)
- Caldera Digital Research Systems Group (DSG), a department of Caldera related to Digital Research operating system development between 1996 and 1998

== See also ==
- Digital Research
- Digital Research Labs (disambiguation)
