= ARX (operating system) =

Operating system developed by Acorn Computers Ltd

- Developer: Acorn Computers Ltd.
- Written in: Modula-2+
- OS family: Unix-like
- Working state: Discontinued
- Marketing target: Low cost paperless office computing workstation
- Available in: English
- Supported platforms: ARM
- Kernel type: Microkernel
- Default user interface: Graphical user interface and special keyboard keys
- License: Proprietary
- Preceded by: MOS
- Succeeded by: Arthur, renamed RISC OS

ARX was an unreleased Mach-like operating system written in Modula-2+ developed by Acorn Computers Ltd in the Acorn Research Centre in Palo Alto for Acorn's new Archimedes personal computers based on the ARM architecture RISC CPUs. Later stages of development were continued by Olivetti after it acquired Acorn, before the project was cancelled and replaced.

== Overview ==
According to the project's application manager Richard Cownie, while Acorn was developing the kernel, it used CAMEL, the C and Acorn Modula Execution Library, with the Acorn Extended Modula-2 (AEM2) compiler, ported from ETH Modula-2. Though never released externally, CAMEL was ported to use on Sun Microsystems Unix computers. In an effort to port Sun's NeWS to the Archimedes, David Chase developed a compiler based on AEM2 for the programming language Modula-3.

ARX was a preemptive multitasking, multithreading, multi-user operating system. Much of the OS ran in user mode and as a result suffered performance problems due to switches into kernel mode to perform mutexes, which led to the introduction of the SWP instruction to the ARM2 v2a instruction set. ARX had support of a file system for optical WORM disks and featured a window system, a window toolkit (and a direct manipulation user interface (UI) editor) and an Interscript-based text editor, for enriched documents written in Interpress (a HTML precursor). The OS had to fit in a 512 KB ROM.

ARX was not finished in time to be used in the Acorn Archimedes range of computers, which shipped in 1987 with an operating system named Arthur. Later renamed RISC OS, this was derived from Acorn MOS as used in the company's earlier BBC Micro range. Confusion persisted about the nature of ARX amongst the wider public and press, with some believing that ARX was Acorn's own Unix variant, with this view being refined in time to accommodate ARX as Acorn's own attempt to deliver a "UNIX look-alike" whose development had been abandoned in favour of a traditional Unix version for the Archimedes, which ultimately emerged as RISC iX.

== See also ==
- RISC iX
