= PL-11 =

Programming language for the PDP-11

PL-11 is a high-level machine-oriented programming language for the PDP-11, developed by R.D. Russell of CERN in 1971. Written in Fortran IV, it is similar to PL360 and is cross-compiled on other machines.

PL-11 was originally developed as part of the Omega project, a particle physics facility operational at CERN (Geneva, Switzerland) during the 1970s. The first version was written for the CII 10070, a clone of the XDS Sigma 7 built in France. Towards the end of the 1970s it was ported to the IBM 370/168, then part of CERN's computer centre. In 1974, it was ported to the Burroughs B6700 at Massey University in New Zealand.

A report describing the language is available from CERN.
