= HP Multi-Programming Executive =

Discontinued mainframe/minicomputer operating system

MPE, MPE XL, MPE/iX
- Developer: Hewlett-Packard
- Written in: System Programming Language, HP Pascal, Assembly language
- Working state: Discontinued
- Initial release: 1974; 52 years ago
- Latest release: 7.5 / August 2002; 23 years ago
- Supported platforms: HP 3000
- Default user interface: Command-line interface
- License: Proprietary
- Official website: MPE/iX at hp.com at the Wayback Machine (archived 2005-03-12)

MPE (Multi-Programming Executive) is a discontinued business-oriented mainframe computer real-time operating system developed by Hewlett-Packard for their HP 3000 computers. While the HP 3000s were initially mini-mainframes, the final high-end systems supported 12 CPUs and over 2000 simultaneous users.

== Description ==
It runs on the HP 3000 family of computers, which originally used HP custom 16-bit stack architecture CISC CPUs and were later migrated to PA-RISC where the operating system was called MPE XL.

In 1983, the original version of MPE was written in a language called SPL (Systems Programming Language). MPE XL was written primarily in Pascal, with some assembly language and some of the old SPL code.

In 1992, the OS name was changed to MPE/iX to indicate Unix interoperability with the addition of POSIX compatibility. The discontinuance of the product line was announced in late 2001, with support from HP terminating at the end of 2010. A number of 3rd party companies still support both the hardware and software.

In 2002, HP released the last version MPE/iX 7.5.

=== Commands ===
Among others, MPE/iX supports the following list of common commands and programs.

- =SHUTDOWN
- BASIC
- CHDIR
- COPY
- DEBUG
- ECHO
- ELSE
- EXIT
- FORTRAN
- HELP
- IF
- PASCAL
- PRINT
- RENAME
- SH
- WHILE
