= MOL-360 =

Computer programming language

MOL-360 is a mid-level systems programming language for the IBM System/360 family of computers based on Algol.

The only data structure supported by the language is arrays. It has no support for floating point data, but allows direct access to processor registers and inline assembly language.

MOL-360 was used by System Development Corporation (SDC) to develop the ADEPT time-sharing system.

A similar language, MOL940, was written for the SDS 940 computer system.
