= JOVIAL =

Programming language

- Paradigms: Procedural, imperative, structured
- Family: ALGOL
- Designed by: System Development Corporation
- Developer: Software Engineering Associates
- First appeared: 1960; 66 years ago
- Typing discipline: static, strong, safe, structural
- Scope: Lexical

Major implementations
- MVS, OpenVMS, macOS, Windows, Linux, SPARC, PowerPC, MIL-STD-1750A, other legacy systems

Dialects
- J3, J3B-2, J73

Influenced by
- ALGOL, SAGE

Influenced
- CMS-2, Coral 66, SYMPL

JOVIAL is a high-level programming language based on ALGOL 58, specialized for developing embedded systems. It was a major system programming language through the 1960s and 1970s.

== History ==
Computer Programming Manual for the Jovial (J73) Language

JOVIAL was developed as a new "high-order" programming language starting in 1959 by a team at System Development Corporation (SDC) headed by Jules Schwartz to compose software for the electronics of military aircraft.

The name JOVIAL is an acronym for Jules' Own Version of the International Algebraic Language; International Algorithmic Language (IAL) was a name proposed originally for ALGOL 58. According to Schwartz, the language was originally called OVIAL, but this was opposed for various reasons. JOVIAL was then suggested, with no meaning attached to the J. Somewhat jokingly it was suggested that the language be named after Schwartz, since he was the meeting chairperson, and this unofficial name stuck.

During the 1960s, JOVIAL was a part of the US Military L-project series, particularly the ITT 465L Strategic Air Command Control System (the Strategic Automated Command and Control System (SACCS) project), due to a lack of real-time computing programming languages available. Some 95 percent of the SACCS project, managed by International Telephone & Telegraph (ITT) with software mainly written by SDC, was written in JOVIAL. The software project took two years and fewer than 1,400 programmer years, less than half of the equivalent time in the SAGE L-project.

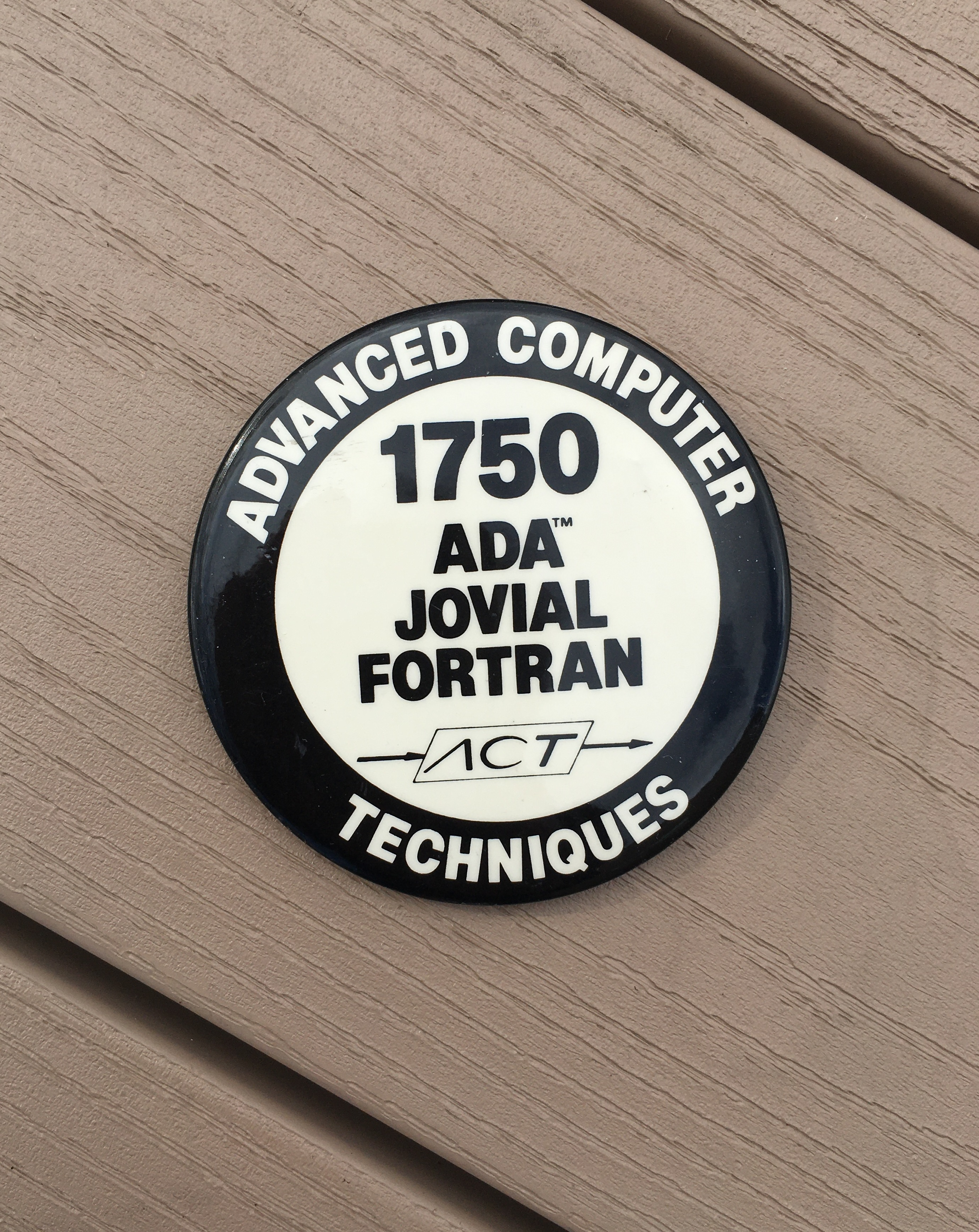
Pin button showing JOVIAL as one of the languages that Advanced Computer Techniques made cross-compilers for

During the late 1970s and early 1980s, the United States Air Force adopted a standardized central processing unit (CPU), the MIL-STD-1750A, and subsequent JOVIAL programs were built for that processor. Several commercial vendors provided compilers and related programming tools to build JOVIAL for processors such as the MIL-STD-1750A, including Advanced Computer Techniques (ACT), TLD Systems, Proprietary Software Systems (PSS), and others.

JOVIAL was standardized during 1973 with MIL-STD-1589 and was revised during 1984 with MIL-STD-1589C. It is still used to update and maintain software on older military vehicles and aircraft. There are three dialects in common use: J3, J3B-2, and J73.

As of 2010, JOVIAL is no longer maintained and distributed by the USAF JOVIAL Program Office (JPO). Software formerly distributed by the JPO is still available through commercial resources at Software Engineering Associates, Inc., (SEA) as are other combinations of host/target processors including Windows, Linux, Mac OS X on PowerPC, SPARC, VAX, 1750A, PowerPC, TI-9989, Zilog Z800x, Motorola 680x0, and IBM System 360, System 370, and System z. Further, DDC-I, which acquired parts of Advanced Computer Techniques, also lists JOVIAL compilers and related tools as of April 2020.

Most software implemented in JOVIAL is mission critical, and maintenance is growing more difficult. In December 2014, it was reported that software derived from JOVIAL code produced in the 1960s was involved in a major failure of the United Kingdom's air traffic control infrastructure, and that the agency that uses it, NATS Holdings, was having to train its IT staff in JOVIAL so they could maintain this software, which was not scheduled for replacement until 2016.

== Influence ==
Languages influenced by JOVIAL include CORAL, SYMPL, Space Programming Language (SPL), and to some extent CMS-2. An interactive subset of JOVIAL called TINT, similar to JOSS was developed in the 1960s.

== Features ==
JOVIAL includes features not found in standard ALGOL, such as items (now called structures), arrays of items, status variables (now called enumerations) and inline assembly language.

It also included provisions for "packed" data within tables. Table packing refers to the allocation of items within an entry to words of storage (bits in a unit of data). This was important with respect to the limited memory and storage of the computing systems of the JOVIAL era.

The Communication Pool (COMPOOL) in Jovial is similar to libraries of header files for languages such as PL/I and C.

== Applications ==
Notable systems using embedded JOVIAL software include:

- Milstar communications satellite
- Advanced Cruise Missile
- B-52, B-1B, B-2 bombers
- C-130, C-141, C-17 transport aircraft
- F-111, F-15, F-16 (prior to Block 50), F-117 fighter aircraft
- LANTIRN
- U-2 aircraft
- Boeing E-3 Sentry AWACS aircraft (Prior to Block 40/45)
- Navy Aegis cruisers
- Army Multiple Launch Rocket System (MLRS)
- Army Sikorsky UH-60 Black Hawk helicopters
- F100, F117, F119 jet engines
- NORAD air defense & control system (Hughes HME-5118ME system)
- NATO Air Defence Ground Environment (NADGE) system
- RL10 rocket engines
- Civil NAS (National Airspace System) Air Traffic Control
- APG-70, APG-71, and APG-73 airborne radar systems

== Example ==
The following example is taken from Computer Programming Manual for the JOVIAL (J73) Language.

PROC RETRIEVE(CODE:VALUE);
   BEGIN
   ITEM CODE U;
   ITEM VALUE F;
   VALUE = -99999.;
   FOR I:0 BY 1 WHILE I<1000;
      IF CODE = TABCODE(I);
         BEGIN
         VALUE = TABVALUE(I);
         EXIT;
         END
   END

This example defines a procedure named RETRIEVE which takes an unsigned integer input argument CODE and a floating-point output argument VALUE. It searches the 1000-element array TABCODE for an entry that matches CODE, and then sets the floating-point variable VALUE to the element of array TABVALUE having the same matching array index. If no matching element is found, VALUE is set to −99999.0.
