= PL360 =

- Paradigms: Procedural, imperative, structured
- Family: Wirth ALGOL
- Designed by: Niklaus Wirth, Joseph W. Wells Jr., Edwin Satterthwaite Jr.
- Developer: Stanford University
- First appeared: 1966; 59 years ago
- Typing discipline: Static, strong
- Scope: Lexical (static)
- Implementation language: ALGOL, then PL360
- Platform: Burroughs B5000, IBM System/360

Influenced by
- ALGOL, Executive Systems Problem Oriented Language (ESPOL)

Influenced
- ALGOL W

PL360 (or PL/360) is a system programming language designed by Niklaus Wirth and written by Wirth, Joseph W. Wells Jr., and Edwin Satterthwaite Jr. for the IBM System/360 computer at Stanford University. A description of PL360 was published in early 1968, although the implementation was probably completed before Wirth left Stanford in 1967.

== Description ==
PL/360 is a one-pass compiler with a syntax similar to ALGOL that provides facilities for specifying exact machine code (language) instructions and registers similar (Note: But lacking facilities for implicit addressability, e.g., USING) to assembly language, but also provides features commonly found in high-level programming languages, such as complex arithmetic expressions and control structures. Wirth used PL360 to create ALGOL W.

Data types are:

- Byte or character – 1 byte
- Short integer – 2 bytes, interpreted as an integer in two's complement binary notation
- Integer or logical – 4 bytes, interpreted as an integer in two's complement binary notation
- Real – 4 bytes, interpreted as a base-16 (hexadecimal) short floating-point arithmetic number
- Long real – 8 bytes, interpreted as a base-16 long floating-point number

Registers can contain integer, real, or long real.

Individual System/360 instructions can be generated inline using the PL360 "function statement" that defined an instruction by format and operation code. Function arguments were assigned sequentially to fields in the instruction. Examples are:

definition	reference	
UNPK(10,#F300)	UNPK(3,7,B2,worker)	
EX(2,#4400)	EX(R1,MVC(0,lines,buffer))	note nested reference

== Example ==
R0, R1, and R2, and FLAG are predeclared names.

    BEGIN INTEGER BUCKET;
         IF FLAG THEN
         BEGIN BUCKET := R0; R0 := R1; R1 := R2;
               R2 := BUCKET;
         END ELSE
         BEGIN BUCKET := R2; R2 := R1; R1 := R0;
              R0 := BUCKET;
         END
         RESET(FLAG);
    END

== Implementation ==
Wirth was at Stanford between 1963 and 1967, during the earlier part of which he was developing his Euler compiler and interpreter, the sources of which are dated 1965. Also in 1965, Stanford updated their core memory-based B5000 with drum storage to a core memory-based B5500 with disk storage.

Since the target IBM S/360 (which was to replace an existing IBM 7090) was not installed until 1967, the initial implementation of PL360 was written in ALGOL and tested on Stanford's B5500. Once working, the compiler was then recoded in PL360, recompiled on the Burroughs system, and moved as a binary file to the S/360.

The B5500 is programmed in a high-level ALGOL-derived language Executive Systems Problem Oriented Language (ESPOL), and PL360 was intended to bring a comparable facility to the IBM mainframe architecture, although it was lacking major facilities of both Assembler F and ESPOL. This intent was largely ignored, with programmers continuing to use implementations of IBM's macro assemblers.

However, in the early 1970s, PL360 was extended to provide more capabilities, and was the programming language of choice for developing Stanford Physics Information Retrieval System (SPIRES), Stanford's Database Management System.

== See also ==
- IBM PL/S
- High-level assembler
- PL-11
