= Language for Systems Development =

Programming language

The Language for Systems Development (LSD) was a programming language developed in 1971 at Brown University for the IBM System/360. The language was also referred to as LSyD due to the negative connotations of the acronym "LSD" at the time. LSD was derived from PL/I.
