= DEC Systems Research Center =

Laboratory in Palo Alto, California

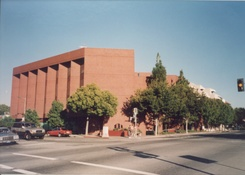
Former location of DEC SRC at 130 Lytton Ave., Palo Alto, CA.

The Systems Research Center (SRC) was a research laboratory created by Digital Equipment Corporation (DEC) in 1984, in Palo Alto, California.

DEC SRC was founded by a group of computer scientists, led by Robert Taylor, who left the Computer Science Laboratory (CSL) of Xerox PARC after an internal power struggle. SRC survived the takeover of DEC by Compaq in 1998. It was renamed to "Compaq Systems Research Center". When Compaq was acquired by Hewlett-Packard in 2002, SRC was merged with other HP corporate research labs and relocated there.

After Taylor's retirement, the lab was directed by Roy Levin and then by Lyle Ramshaw.

Some of the critical developments made at SRC include the Modula-3 programming language; the snoopy cache, used in the first multiprocessor workstation, the Firefly, built from MicroVAX 78032 microprocessors; the first multi-threaded Unix system, Taos; the first user interface editor; early networked window systems, Trestle. AltaVista was jointly developed by researchers from DEC's Network Systems Laboratory, Western Research Laboratory and Systems Research Center. Among the researchers at SRC, there are Butler Lampson, Chuck Thacker, and Leslie Lamport, all recipients of the ACM A.M. Turing Award.

A later inhabitant of this building is A9.com, a research part of Amazon.com.
