= Griswold (surname) =

Griswold (also spelled Griswald) is a surname of English origin, from the Old English greosn (‘gravel’) and weald (‘woodland’). However, some interoperations consider Griswold to mean "Gris" meaning "Grey" and "wold" meaning wood/forest. The surname Gris is a name of ancient French origin. It was a Breton name given to a person with gray hair. The name Gris is derived from the Old French word "gris," which means "gray," and was often given to someone with gray hair. The name Wold is derived from the Old English wald meaning "forest", (cognate of German Wald, but unrelated to English "wood", which has a different origin). Wold is an Anglian form of the word, as in other parts of England, different variations can be found. Notable people with the surname include:

- A. Minor Griswold (1834–1891), American humorist, journalist, and lecturer, known by his pen name The Fat Contributor
- Alexander Viets Griswold (1766–1843), Protestant Episcopalian bishop and evangelist in the U.S.
- Alfred Whitney Griswold (1906–1963), president of Yale University
- Bill Griswold, American computer scientist
- Charles L. Griswold, American philosopher
- Daniel T. Griswold, director of the Cato Institute's Center for Trade Policy Studies
- Deirdre Griswold, American politician
- Don T. Griswold (1917–1943), U.S. Navy ensign
- Dwight Griswold (1893–1954), American politician
- Edith Julia Griswold (1863–1926), American lawyer and patent expert
- Erwin Griswold (1904–1994), U.S. Solicitor General
- Florence Griswold (1850–1937), founder of the "Lyme Art Colony" in Old Lyme, Connecticut
- Frances Irene Burge Griswold (1826–1900), American writer
- Francis H. Griswold, (1904–1989), U.S. Air Force lieutenant general
- Frank Griswold (1937–2023), 25th presiding bishop of the Episcopal Church
- Gaylord Griswold (1767–1809), American politician
- Glenn Griswold (1890–1940), American politician
- George Griswold (died 1857), American politician
- Harry W. Griswold (1886–1939), American politician
- Hattie Tyng Griswold (1842–1909), American writer, poet
- Hiram Griswold (1807–1881), American politician and lawyer from Ohio
- Jena Griswold, American politician
- John Ashley Griswold (1822–1902), American politician
- John Augustus Griswold (1822–1872), American politician
- Kate E. Griswold (c. 1869-?), American editor, publisher, proprietor
- Larry Griswold (1905–1996), American gymnast
- Mabel E. Griswold (1888–1955), American activist
- Mark Griswold, American engineer
- Matthew Griswold (congressman) (1833–1919), American politician
- Matthew Griswold (governor) (1714–1799), American politician
- Morley Griswold (1890–1951), American politician
- Oscar Griswold (1886–1959), American general during World War II
- Putnam Griswold (1875–1914), American singer
- Ralph Griswold (1934–2006), American computer scientist
- Robert Griswold (born 1996), American swimmer
- Robert E. (Bob) Griswold (born 1935), American motivational speaker
- Roger Griswold (1762–1812), American politician
- Rufus Wilmot Griswold (1815–1857), American editor, critic, and anthologist
- Samuel Griswold (1790–1867), American industrial pioneer
- Samuel Griswold Goodrich (1793–1860), American author, better known under the pseudonym Peter Parley
- Stanley Griswold (1763–1815), American politician
- Tom Griswold (born 1953), American radio host
- William Griswold (disambiguation), several people
- Zona Maie Griswold (1889–1961), American singer

== Fictional characters ==
- Clark Griswold, in National Lampoon's Vacation film series
- Gus Griswald, in the Recess television series
- Griswold, the mystery solver in Isaac Asimov's The Union Club Mysteries.

== See also ==
- Justice Griswold (disambiguation)
