= Comparison of programming languages (array) =

List of programming language comparisons

This comparison of programming languages (array) compares the features of array data structures or matrix processing for various computer programming languages.

== Syntax ==
=== Array dimensions ===
The following list contains syntax examples of how to determine the dimensions (index of the first element, the last element or the size in elements).

Some languages index from zero. Some index from one. Some carry no such restriction, or even allow indexing by any enumerated type, not only integers.

Languages	Size	First	Last
Ada	name'Length	name'First	name'Last
ALGOL 68	UPB name - LWB name+1 2 UPB name - 2 LWB name+1 etc.	LWB name 2 LWB name etc.	UPB name 2 UPB name etc.
APL	⍴ name (⍴ name)[index]	⎕IO	(⍴ name)-~⎕IO (⍴ name)[index]-~⎕IO
AWK	length	1	asorti
C#, Visual Basic (.NET), Windows PowerShell, F#	name.Length	name.GetLowerBound(dimension)	name.GetUpperBound(dimension)
CFML	arrayLen(name) name.len()	1	name.len()
Ch	max(shape(name))	0	max(shape(name))-1
Common Lisp	(length name)	0	(1- (length name))
D	name.length	0	name.length-1 $-1
Fortran	size(name)	lbound(name)	ubound(name)
Go	len(name)	0	len(name) - 1
Haskell	rangeSize (bounds name)	fst (bounds name)	snd (bounds name)
ISLISP	(length name)	0	(1- (length name))
Icon	*name	1	*name
Cobra, D, Haxe, Java, JavaScript, Scala	name.length	0	name.length - 1
J	#name	0	<:@#name
JavaScript (ES2022)	name.length	0 name.at(0)	name.length - 1 name.at(-1)
Julia	length(name) size(name)	begin first.(axes(name))	end last.(axes(name))
Lingo	count(name)	1	getLast(name)
LiveCode	length(name)	1 first	-1 last
Lizp4	(arrlen name)	0	(1- (arrlen name))
Lua	#name	1 by convention; any integer	#name
Mathematica	Length[name]	1 First[name]	-1; Last[name]
MATLAB, GNU Octave	length(name)	1	end
Nim	name.len	name.low	name.high
Oberon	LEN(name)	0	LEN(name) - 1
Object Pascal	Length(name)	0 low(name)	Length(name)-1 high(name)
Objective-C (NSArray * only)	[name count]	0	[name count] - 1
OCaml	Array.length name	0	Array.length name - 1
Perl	scalar(@name)	$[	$#name
PHP	count(name)	0	count(name) - 1
PL/I	dim(name[,dim])	lbound(name[,dim])	hbound(name[,dim])
Python	len(name)	0	-1 len(name) - 1
R	length(name)	1	length(name)
Raku	@name.elems	0	@name.end
Rebol, Red	length? name	name/1 first name	last name
Ruby	name.size	0 name.first	-1 name.size - 1 name.last
Rust	name.len()	0	name.len() - 1
S-Lang	length(name)	0	-1 length(name)-1
Scheme	(vector-length vector)	0	(- (vector-length vector) 1)
Smalltalk	name size	1 name first	name size name last
Swift	name.count	0	name.count - 1
Unicon	*name	1	*name
Visual Basic	UBound(name)-LBound(name)+1	LBound(name)	UBound(name)
Wolfram Language	Length[name]	1 First[name]	-1; Last[name]
Xojo	UBound(name)	0	UBound(name)
XPath, XQuery	count($name)	1	count($name) last() array:size(name)

=== Indexing ===
The following list contains syntax examples of how to access a single element of an array.

Format	Languages
name[index] or name[index_{1}, index_{2}] etc.	ALGOL 58, ALGOL 60, ALGOL 68, AWK, Julia, Modula, Pascal, Object Pascal, C#, S-Lang Icon, Unicon
name[index] or name[index_{1}; index_{2}] etc. or index⌷name or index_{1} index_{2}⌷name etc.	APL
name[index]	ActionScript, C, CFML, Ch, Cobra, C++, D, Go, Haxe, Java, JavaScript, Lingo, Lua, Nim, Objective-C (NSArray *), Perl, PHP, Python, R, Ruby, Rust, Swift
$name[index]	Perl, Windows PowerShell, XPath, XQuery
@name[index]	Raku
name(index) or name(index_{1}, index_{2}) etc.	Ada, ALGOL W, BASIC, COBOL, Fortran, RPG, GNU Octave, MATLAB, PL/I, Scala, Visual Basic, Visual Basic (.NET), Xojo
$name(index)	XPath, XQuery
name.(index)	OCaml
name.[index]	F#, OCaml
name/index	Rebol, Red
name ! index	Haskell
$name ? index	XPath, XQuery
(vector-ref name index)	Scheme
(aref name index)	Common Lisp
(elt name index)	ISLISP
(arrget name index)	Lizp4
name[[index]]	Mathematica, Wolfram Language
name at:index	Smalltalk
[name objectAtIndex:index]	Objective-C (NSArray * only)
index{name	J
name.item(index) or name @ index	Eiffel

=== Slicing ===
The following list contains syntax examples of how a range of element of an array can be accessed.

In the following table:

- first – the index of the first element in the slice
- last – the index of the last element in the slice
- end – one more than the index of last element in the slice
- len – the length of the slice (= end - first)
- step – the number of array elements in each (default 1)

Format	Languages
name[first:last]	ALGOL 68, Julia, Icon, Unicon
name[first+(⍳len)-⎕IO]	APL
name[first:end:step]	Python
name[first:end]	Go
name[first..last]	Pascal, Object Pascal, Delphi, Nim
$name[first..last]	Windows PowerShell
@name[first..last]	Perl
name[first..last] name[first...end] name[first, len]	Ruby
copy/part skip name first len	Rebol, Red
name(first..last)	Ada
name(first:last)	Fortran, GNU Octave, MATLAB
name[[first;;last;;step]]	Mathematica, Wolfram Language
name[[first:last]]	S-Lang
name.[first..step..last]	F#
name.slice(first, end)	Haxe, JavaScript, Scala
name.slice(first, len)	CFML
array_slice(name, first, len)	PHP
(subseq name first end)	Common Lisp
(subseq name first end)	ISLISP
(arrpart name first len)	Lizp4
Array.sub name first len	OCaml
[name subarrayWithRange:NSMakeRange(first, len)]	Objective-C (NSArray * only)
(first([+i.@(-~)end){name	J
name[first..<end] name[first...last]	Swift
name copyFrom: first to:last name copyFrom: first count:len	Smalltalk
name[first..end]	D, C#
name[first..end] name[first..=last]	Rust
name[first:end]	Cobra
table.move(name, first, last, 1, {})	Lua

== Array system cross-reference list ==
Language	Default base index	Specifiable index type	Specifiable base index	Bound check	Multidimensional	Dynamically sized	Vectorized operations
Ada	index type	yes	yes	checked	yes	init	some, others definable
ALGOL 68	1	no	yes	varies	yes	yes	user definable
APL	1	?	0 or 1	checked	yes	yes	yes
AWK	1	yes, implicitly	no	unchecked	yes, as delimited string	yes, rehashed	no
BASIC	0	?	no	checked	no	init	?
C	0	no	no	unchecked	partially	init, heap	no
Ch	0	no	no	checked	yes, also array of array	init, heap	yes
C++	0	no	no	unchecked	yes, also array of array	heap	no
C#	0	no	partial	checked	yes	heap	yes (LINQ select)
CFML	1	no	no	checked	yes, also array of array	yes	no
COBOL	1	no	no	checked	array of array	no	some intrinsics
Cobra	0	no	no	checked	array of array	heap	?
Common Lisp	0	?	no	checked	yes	yes	yes (map or map-into)
D	0	yes	no	varies	yes	yes	?
F#	0	no	partial	checked	yes	heap	yes (map)
FreeBASIC	0	no	yes	checked	yes	init, init	?
Fortran	1	yes	yes	varies	yes	yes	yes
FoxPro	1	?	no	checked	yes	yes	?
Go	0	no	no	checked	array of array	no	no
Hack	0	yes	yes	checked	yes	yes	yes
Haskell	0	yes	yes	checked	yes, also array of array	init	?
IDL	0	?	no	checked	yes	yes	yes
ISLISP	0	?	no	checked	yes	init	yes (map or map-into)
J	0	?	no	checked	yes	yes	yes
Java	0	no	no	checked	array of array	init	?
JavaScript	0	no	no	checked	array of array	yes	yes
Julia	1	yes	yes	checked (can be skipped locally; or globally by user)	yes, also array of array	yes	yes
Lingo	1	?	?	unchecked	yes	yes	yes
Lizp4	0	?	no	checked	array of array	init	yes (map)
Lua	1	?	partial	checked	array of array	yes	?
Mathematica	1	no	no	checked	yes	yes	yes
MATLAB	1	?	no	checked	yes	yes	yes
Nim	0	yes	yes	optional	array of array	yes	yes
Oberon	0	?	no	checked	yes	no	?
Oberon-2	0	?	no	checked	yes	yes	?
Objective-C	0	no	no	checked	array of array	yes	no
OCaml	0	no	no	checked by default	array of array	init	?
Pascal, Object Pascal	index type	yes	yes	varies	yes	varies	some
Perl	0	no	yes ($[)	checked	array of array	yes	no
Raku	0	no	no	checked	yes	yes	yes
PHP	0	yes	yes	checked	yes	yes	yes
PL/I	1	yes	yes	optional	yes	no	yes
Python	0	no	no	checked	array of array	yes	no
RPG	1	no	no	?	no	no	?
R	1	?	no	unchecked	yes, also array of array	yes	yes
Ruby	0	no	no	checked	array of array	yes	?
Rust	0	no	no	checked	array of array	no	?
Sass	1	no	no	checked	array of array	init	?
S-Lang	0	?	no	checked	yes	yes	yes
Scala	0	no	no	checked	array of array	init	yes (map)
Scheme	0	?	no	checked	array of array	init	yes (map)
Smalltalk	1	?	no	checked	array of array	yes	?
Swift	0	no	no	checked	array of array	yes	?
Visual Basic (classic)	0, 1, or index type	no	yes	checked	yes	yes	?
Visual Basic (.NET)	0 or index type	no	partial	checked	yes	yes	yes (LINQ select)
Wolfram Language	1	no	no	checked	yes	yes	yes
Windows PowerShell	0	no	no	checked	yes	heap	?
Xojo	0	no	no	checked	yes	yes	no
XPath, XQuery	1	no	no	checked	array of array	yes	yes

== Vectorized array operations ==
Some compiled languages such as Ada and Fortran, and some scripting languages such as IDL, MATLAB, and S-Lang, have native support for vectorized operations on arrays. For example, to perform an element by element sum of two arrays, a and b to produce a third c, it is only necessary to write

c = a + b

In addition to support for vectorized arithmetic and relational operations, these languages also vectorize common mathematical functions such as sine. For example, if x is an array, then

y = sin (x)

will result in an array y whose elements are sine of the corresponding elements of the array x.

Vectorized index operations are also supported. As an example,

even = x(2::2);
odd = x(::2);

is how one would use Fortran to create arrays from the even and odd entries of an array. Another common use of vectorized indices is a filtering operation. Consider a clipping operation of a sine wave where amplitudes larger than 0.5 are to be set to 0.5. Using S-Lang, this can be done by

y = sin(x);
y[where(abs(y)>0.5)] = 0.5;

=== Mathematical matrix operations ===
Language, library	Create	Determinant	Transpose	Element	Column	Row	Eigenvalues
APL	m←dims⍴x11 x12 ...	-.×m	⍉m	m[i;j] or i j⌷m	m[;j] or j⌷[2]m or j⌷⍤1⊢m or j⌷⍉m	m[i;] or i⌷m	⌹⍠1⊢m
Fortran	m = RESHAPE([x11, x12, ...], SHAPE(m))		TRANSPOSE(m)	m(i,j)	m(:,j)	m(i,:)	
Ch	m = {...}	determinant(m)	transpose(m)	m[i-1][j-1]	shape(m,0)	shape(m,1)	eigen(output, m, NULL)
Julia and its standard library LinearAlgebra	m = [1 2; 3 4] or m = [     1 2     3 4 ]	det(m)	transpose(m) or m' for real matrices	m[i, j]	m[:, j]	m[i, :]	eigen(m).values
Mathematica, Wolfram Language	{{x11, x12, ...}, ...}	Det[m]	Transpose[m]	m[[i,j]]	m[[;;,j]]	m[[i]]	Eigenvalues[m]
MATLAB, Octave	m = [...]	det(m)	m.'	m(i,j)	m(:,j)	m(i,:)	eig(m)
NumPy	m = mat(...)	linalg.det(m)	m.T	m[i-1,j-1]	m[:,j-1]	m[i-1,:]	linalg.eigvals(m)
R	m <- matrix(...) or m <- array(...)	det(m)	t(m)	m[i, j]	m[, j]	m[i, ]	eigen(m)
S-Lang	m = reshape([x11, x12, ...], [new-dims])		m = transpose(m)	m[i,j]	m[*,j]	m[j,*]	
SymPy	m = Matrix(...)	m.det()	m.T	m[i-1,j-1]	m.col(j-1)	m.row(i-1)	m.eigenvals()
