= COMIT =

Computer programming language

- Designed by: Victor Yngve
- First appeared: 1957; 69 years ago

Influenced
- SNOBOL

COMIT was the first string processing language (compare SNOBOL, TRAC, and Perl), developed on the IBM 700/7000 series computers by Victor Yngve, University of Chicago, and collaborators at MIT from 1957 to 1965. Yngve created the language for supporting computerized research in the field of linguistics, and more specifically, the area of machine translation for natural language processing. The creation of COMIT led to the creation of SNOBOL, which stand out apart from other programming languages of the era (during the 50s and 60s) for having patterns as first class data type.

Bob Fabry, University of Chicago, was responsible for COMIT II on Compatible Time-Sharing System.
