= SL5 =

SL5 may refer to:

- Route SL5 (MBTA), a bus route in Boston, Massachusetts, United States
- China Railways SL5, a type of steam locomotive
- London Buses route SL5
- SL5 (programming language)
- SL5, a postcode district in the SL postcode area in the United Kingdom
