= Data exchange =

Data management process

Data exchange is the process of moving data from one information system to another. It often involves transforming data that is native to the source system into a form that is consumable by the target system or to a standardized form that is consumable by any compatible system. In particular, data exchange allows data to be shared between computer programs.

Data exchange is similar to data integration except that data may be restructured with possible loss of content. There may be no way to transform a particular collection based on exchange constraints. Conversely, there may be multiple ways to transform the data, in which case one option must be identified in order to achieve compatibility between source and target.

There are two main types of data exchange: broadcast and peer-to-peer (a.k.a. unicast). For broadcast, data is transmitted simultaneously to all consumers. Just as a conference call, all participants get the same information from the speaker at the same time. For peer-to-peer, data is sent to a single receiver, defined by a specific address. For example, a letter goes to just one mail box.

== Single-domain ==
In some domains, a multiple source and target schema (proprietary data formats) may exist. An exchange or interchange format is often developed for a single domain, and then necessary routines (mappings) are written to (indirectly) transform/translate each and every source schema to each and every target schema by using the interchange format as an intermediate step. That requires less work than writing and debugging the many routines that would be required to directly translate each source schema directly to each target schema.

Examples of these transformative interchange formats include:

- Standard Interchange Format for geospatial data;
- Data Interchange Format for spreadsheet data;
- Open Document Format for spreadsheets, charts, presentations and word processing documents;
- GPS eXchange Format or Keyhole Markup Language for describing GPS data;
- GDSII for integrated circuit layout.

== Representation ==
A data exchange (a.k.a. interchange) language defines a domain-independent way to represent data. These languages have evolved from being markup and display-oriented to support the encoding of metadata that describes the structural attributes of the information.

Practice has shown that certain types of formal languages are better suited for this task than others, since their specification is driven by a formal process instead of particular software implementation. For example, XML is a markup language that was designed to enable the creation of dialects (the definition of domain-specific sublanguages). However, it does not contain domain-specific dictionaries or fact types. Beneficial to a reliable data exchange is the availability of standard dictionaries-taxonomies and tools libraries such as parsers, schema validators, and transformation tools.

=== XML ===
The popularity of XML for data exchange on the World Wide Web has several reasons. First of all, it is closely related to the preexisting standards Standard Generalized Markup Language (SGML) and Hypertext Markup Language (HTML), and as such a parser written to support these two languages can be easily extended to support XML as well. For example, XHTML has been defined as a format that is formal XML, but understood correctly by most (if not all) HTML parsers.

=== YAML ===
YAML was designed to be human-readable and authored via a text editor with notion similar to reStructuredText and wiki syntax. YAML 1.2 also includes a shorthand notion that is compatible with JSON, and as such any JSON document is also valid YAML; this however does not hold the other way.

=== REBOL ===
REBOL was designed to be human-readable and authored via a text editor. It uses a simple free-form syntax with minimal punctuation and a rich set of data types (such as URL, email, date and time, tuple, string, tag) that respect common standards. It is designed to not need any additional meta-language, being designed in a metacircular fashion which is why the parse dialect used for definitions and transformations of REBOL dialects is also itself a dialect of REBOL. REBOL was used as a source of inspiration for JSON.

=== Gellish ===
Gellish English is a formalized subset of natural English (language), which includes a simple grammar and a large, extensible dictionary (taxonomy) that defines the general and domain specific terminology, whereas the concepts are arranged in a hierarchy, which supports inheritance of knowledge and requirements. The dictionary also includes standardized fact types. The terms and relation types together can be used to create and interpret expressions of facts, knowledge, requirements and other information. Gellish can be used in combination with SQL, RDF/XML, OWL and various other meta-languages. The Gellish standard is a combination of ISO 10303-221 (AP221) and ISO 15926.

=== List ===
The following describes and compares popular data exchange languages.

Name	Schemas	Flexible	Semantic verification	Dictionary	Information Model	Synonyms and homonyms	Dialecting	Web standard	Trans-formations	Light-weight	Human readable	Compatibility
RDF	Yes^{[1]}	Yes	Yes	Yes	Yes	Yes	Yes	Yes	Yes	Yes	Partial	Subset of Semantic web
XML	Yes^{[2]}	Yes	No	No	No	No	Yes	Yes	Yes	No	Yes	subset of SGML, HTML
Atom	Yes	Unknown	Unknown	Unknown	No	Unknown	Yes	Yes	Yes	No	No	XML dialect
JSON	No	Unknown	Unknown	Unknown	No	Unknown	No	Yes	No	Yes	Yes	subset of YAML
YAML	No^{[3]}	Unknown	Unknown	Unknown	No	Unknown	No	No	No^{[3]}	Yes	Yes^{[4]}	superset of JSON
REBOL	Yes^{[7]}	Yes	No	Yes	No	Yes	Yes	No	Yes^{[7]}	Yes	Yes^{[5]}	
Gellish	Yes	Yes	Yes	Yes^{[8]}	No	Yes	Yes	ISO	No	Yes	Partial^{[6]}	SQL, RDF/XML, OWL

Columns

- Schemas – Whether supports representing domain specific data structure definition
- Flexible – Whether supports extension of the semantic expression capabilities without modifying the schema
- Semantic verification – Whether supports semantic verification of the correctness of expressions in the language
- Dictionary – Whether includes a dictionary and a taxonomy (hierarchy) of concepts with inheritance
- Information model – Whether supports an information model
- Synonyms and homonyms – Whether supports the use of synonyms and homonyms in expressions
- Dialecting – Whether is available in multiple natural languages or dialects
- Web standard – Whether is standardized by a recognized body
- Transformations – Whether includes a translation to other standards
- Lightweight – Whether a lightweight version is available
- Human readable – Whether expressions are understandable without training
- Compatibility – Which other tools can be used or are required

== See also ==
- Comma-separated values – Text format
- communication protocol – System for exchanging messages between computing systems
- Data transfer – Transfer of data over a communication channel
- Lightweight markup language – Markup language with simple, unobtrusive syntax
- Modeling language – Notation expressing information under a rule set
- RSS – Family of web feed formats

== Notes ==
1. RDF is a schema-flexible language.
2. The schema of XML contains a very limited grammar and vocabulary.
3. Available as an extension.
4. In the default format, not the compact syntax.
5. The syntax is fairly simple (the language was designed to be human-readable); the dialects may require domain knowledge.
6. The standardized fact types are denoted by standardized English phrases, which interpretation and use needs some training.
7. The Parse dialect is used to specify, validate, and transform dialects.
8. The English version includes a Gellish English Dictionary-Taxonomy that also includes standardized fact types (= kinds of relations).
