= Ralph Griswold =

American computer scientist

Ralph E. Griswold (May 19, 1934, Modesto, CA – October 4, 2006, Tucson, AZ) was a computer scientist known for his research into high-level programming languages and symbolic computation. His language credits include the string processing language SNOBOL, SL5, and Icon.

He attended Stanford University, receiving a bachelor's degree in physics, then an M.S. and Ph.D. in electrical engineering. Griswold went to Bell Labs in 1962, where he studied ideas for non-numerical computation. SNOBOL was the outcome; it was a radically different language in its time and still is. He became the head of the Labs' Programming Research and Development department in 1967.

In 1971, he was hired by the University of Arizona to be its first professor of computer science, subsequently organized the department, and was its head until 1981. While at Arizona, Griswold developed Icon. The earlier Ratfor implementation of Icon was discarded and the language rewritten from scratch in C and UNIX.

In 1990 Griswold was appointed Regents' Professor, and he retired in 1995. "As one of the founders of the Bell Labs software culture that spawned UNIX, C, and many other essential contributions to modern software, Ralph Griswold brought to his academic research not only brilliance, but also experience and a value system that demanded that research ideas be tested by fire and proven useful and usable by real users, not just good-looking diagrams in academic papers."

After his retirement, his interests turned to the mathematical aspects of weaving.

Griswold died on October 4, 2006, from cancer.

Griswold's son, Bill Griswold, is also a computer scientist.
