= William Griswold =

William Griswold may refer to:

- Bill Griswold, professor of computer science and engineering
- William Griswold (museum director), museum director and curator
- William A. Griswold (1775–1846), Vermont politician and attorney
- William M. Griswold (1823–1889), Wisconsin politician
