= Justice Griswold =

Justice Griswold may refer to:

- Matthew Griswold (governor) (1714–1799), chief justice of the Superior Court of Connecticut
- Roger Griswold (1762–1812), associate justice of the Connecticut Supreme Court
