= Perl 5 version history =

List of versions of a programming language

Perl is an open-source programming language whose first version, 1.0, was released in 1987. The following table contains the Perl 5 version history, showing its release versions. Not all versions are covered yet.

Note that additional minor release versions may not be shown in this chart, unless they include notable changes or are the latest supported version. Additional information can be found on the official Perl website.

== Version history ==
Legend:	Current	Toolchain	Legacy

Release numbers use semantic versioning since 5.6, where even-numbered minor versions (e.g. 5.36) are stable releases, and odd numbers are experimental development versions. The patch number is usually omitted in discussions of Perl versions.

The Perl Maintenance and Support Policy is to "support the two most recent stable release series" although important security fixes may be applied to stable releases from the past three years.

Note that this is separate from the Perl Toolchain (utilities for developing, building and installing Perl modules) Support Policies, which will informally support older releases. The current policy is to support Perl v5.16 or earlier until July 2024, and then to support releases than have been available for at least ten years.

Version	Release date	Links	Changes
5.44.0	July 15, 2026	Full release notes	Experimental named parameters in signatures; Multi-variable foreach can now use aliased references; Enhanced operation of regular expression patterns under /xx; Unicode 17.0 support; New source of entropy for PRNG seeding; Security fixes; Unicode rules are now fully enforced on identifier and regular expression group names; Using goto to jump into the body of a loop or other block construct from outside is no longer permitted; m/...[...].../xx has new restrictions; Performance enhancements; Perl XS reference manual (perlxs) rewritten and modernized
5.42.0	July 3, 2025	Full release notes	New :writer attribute on field variables; Lexical method declaration using my method and invocation using operator ->&; New any and all operators; New pragma source::encoding; Assigning logical xor ^^= operator; More CORE:: subs; Switch and Smart Match operator kept, behind a feature; Apostrophe as a global name separator can be disabled; Support Unicode 16.0; Security fixes and performance enhancements
5.40.3	August 3, 2025	Full release notes	Security fixes
5.40.2	April 13, 2025	Full release notes	Security fixes
5.40.0	June 9, 2024	Full release notes	New __CLASS__ keyword; Added the :reader attribute for field variables; Added builtin inf and nan functions (experimental); New logical ^^ xor medium-precedence operator; The try/catch feature is no longer experimental; Security fixes
5.38.4	April 13, 2025	Full release notes	Security fixes
5.38.2	November 29, 2023	Full release notes	Security fixes; Note: 5.38.1 was withdrawn due to a broken release
5.38.0	July 3, 2023	Full release notes	New class feature; Unicode 15; Deprecation warnings now have specific subcategories; API hooks; Ability to set a consistent random seed; Defined-or and logical-or assignment default expressions in subroutine signatures; Regex quantifiers limit increased to I32_MAX; Use of single-quote as a package separator deprecated; Performance enhancements; Flow-control improvements to defer and finally blocks; The Switch and Smart Match added in v5.10 are deprecated
5.36.3	November 29, 2023	Full release notes	Security fixes; Note: 5.36.2 was withdrawn due to a broken release
5.36.1	April 23, 2023	Full release notes	Bug fixes
5.36.0	May 28, 2022	Full release notes	isa operator no longer considered experimental; Unicode 14; Regex sets no longer considered experimental; Variable length lookbehind in regexes no longer considered experimental; Boolean tracking; New builtin functions; Subroutine signatures no longer considered experimental; Added `defer` blocks; Experimental try/catch with finally blocks; Experimental n-at-a-time for iterators
5.34.3	November 29, 2023	Full release notes	Security fixes; Note: 5.34.2 was withdrawn due to a broken release
5.34.1	March 13, 2022	Full release notes	Bug fixes
5.34.0	May 20, 2021	Full release notes	Experimental try/catch syntax; Empty lower bound in regular expression quantifiers (qr/{,n}/); New octal syntax with 0o prefixes (e.g., 0o123_456)
5.32.1	January 23, 2021	Full release notes	New documentation perlgov and perlsecpolicy
5.32.0	June 20, 2020	Full release notes	Experimental isa operator; Chained comparisons (e.g. 1 <= $x <= 10); Unicode 13.0 is supported; Numeric variables cannot be prefixed with 0.
5.30.3	June 1, 2020	Full release notes	Security fixes
5.30.2	March 14, 2020	Full release notes	Bug fixes and module updates
5.30.1	November 10, 2019	Full release notes	Bug fixes and module updates
5.30.0	May 22, 2019	Full release notes	Unicode 12.1 support; Variable length lookbehind in regular expression patterns
5.28.0	June 22, 2018	Full release notes	Unicode 10.0 is supported; delete on key/value hash slices; alphabetic synonyms for some regular expression assertions (experimental); Mixed Unicode scripts are now detectable; In-place editing with perl -i is now safer; Initialisation of aggregate state variables; Full-size inode numbers; The sprintf %j format size modifier is now available with pre-C99 compilers; Close-on-exec flag set atomically; String- and number-specific bitwise ops are no longer experimental; Locales are now thread-safe on systems that support them; New read-only predefined variable ${^SAFE_LOCALES}; Security fixes; Subroutine attribute and signature order was flipped to the original order from v5.20; The sort algorithm can no longer be changed. The sort pragma is a no-op.
5.26.0	May 30, 2017	Full release notes	For security reasons, the current directory (".") is no longer included by default at the end of the module search path (@INC); Lexical subroutines are no longer experimental; Indented Here-documents; New regular expression modifiers and capture groups; Unicode 9.0 is now supported; Perl can now do default collation in UTF-8 locales on platforms that support it; New declared_refs experimental feature
5.24.0	May 8, 2016	Full release notes	Unicode 8.0 is now supported.; New line break boundary in regular expressions; Extended Bracketed Character Classes work in UTF-8 locales; More explicit definitions for integer shifting; Reordered precision arguments for printf and sprintf; More fields provided to sigaction callback; The experimental autoderef feature was removed.; Postfix dereferencing is no longer experimental.
5.22.0	June 1, 2015	Full release notes	Unicode 7.0 is now supported.; The historical modules CGI.pm and Module::Build were removed from the core distribution.; The double diamond operator; Disambiguated bitwise operators (as an experimental feature); Variable aliasing (as an experimental feature); Subroutine attribute and signature order was flipped, but this was flipped back in v5.28
5.20.0	May 27, 2014	Full release notes	Subroutine signatures (as an experimental feature); Postfix dereferencing (as an experimental feature); Key/value slice syntax
5.18.0	May 18, 2013	Full release notes	regular expression character set operations (as an experimental feature); lexical subroutines (as an experimental feature)
5.16.0	May 20, 2012	Full release notes	__SUB__ for currently-executing subroutine; encoding-disambiguated eval; fc case-folding function
5.14.0	May 14, 2011	Full release notes	Unicode 6.0 is supported; Unicode semantics applied to all strings; Non-destructive substitution (s///r); Added /d, /l, /u and /a regular expression modifiers; Re-entrant regular expressions; Automatic dereference (autoderef) by built-ins (experimental feature, removed in v5.24)
5.12.0	April 12, 2010	Full release notes	Unicode 5.2 is supported; New package NAME VERSION syntax; The ... operator added; Implicit strictures with use 5.12.0 (or later version); Year 2038 compliance
5.10.1	August 23, 2009	Full release notes	Incompatible changes to the range operators and defined-or in boolean context, which affects the new switch feature; Incompatible changes to the smart match operator; Unicode 5.1.0 is supported; A new interface for pluggable Method Resolution Orders; A new overloading pragma; Parallel tests; DTrace support; Bug fixes and module updates; setuidperl deprecated
5.10.0	December 18, 2007	Full release notes	Unicode 5.0 is supported; New feature pragma; New defined-or operator (//); New switch feature and related smart match operator (~~); Numerous new regular expression features; New say built-in (via feature say); Ability to declare static variables with state
5.8.1	September 25, 2003	Perl 5.8.1 Release Notes	Improved randomization of hash order, for security reasons.; Unicode is not enabled by default based on locale settings.; Version strings on the left of a fat comma are treated as string literals.; Unsafe signals were re-added.; Improved tied arrays with negative indexes; Supports Unicode 4.0.0; Pseudo-hashes are deprecated; Old-style threads are deprecated.; Various module upgrades.; The `strict` pragma checks parameters.; Documentation improvements.; Bug fixes.
5.8.0	July 18, 2002	Perl 5.8.0 Release Announcement	Supports Unicode 3.2.0; Regular expressions now work with Unicode; Support for non-Latin encodings via Encode module; Introduction of interpreter threads; New PerlIO implementation; Scalars can be used as file handles; Improved numeric accuracy for string-number conversion via built-in routine; Finalized 64-bit support; New sort pragma to change the sort algorithm. (This was disabled in v5.28.); New modules: Digest::MD5, File::Temp, Filter::Simple, libnet, List::Util, Memoize, MIME::Base64, Scalar::Util, Storable, Switch, Test::More, Test::Simple, Text::Balanced, Tie::File, etc.; Incompatibilities: Perl 5.8 is not binary compatible with any earlier Perl release; 64-bit versions no longer use Perl malloc.; hash order changed; dump() command becomes obsolete.; 5.005 threads are deprecated.; user-visible implementation of pseudohashes is deprecated and scheduled for removal; Use of tainted data in exec LIST and system LIST issues warning, and will become fatal error in a future release; For tr///C, tr///U, pack("C0", ...) and pack("U0", ...) can be used instead
5.6.0	March 22, 2000	Perl v5.6.0 released	Version numbering changed to 'revision.version.subversion' format; Internal representation for strings is changed to UTF-8, with EBCDIC support discontinued.; Better support for interpreter concurrency.; String literals can be written using character ordinals.; New syntax for subroutine attributes. (The attrs pragma is now deprecated.); Support for large files, where available.; Support for binary numbers.; JPL ("Java Perl Lingo") distribution comes bundled with Perl.; Much new documentation in the form of tutorials and reference information has been added.; Experimental features: Support for Unicode; Support for threading, and the fork() emulation on Windows.; 64-bit support.; Lvalue subroutines.; Weak references.; Pseudo-hash data type.
5.005	July 22, 1998	5.005 released (with maintenance update 01)	5.005 is not binary compatible with previous releases.; Source code now in ANSI C.; New supported platforms include BeOS, DOS, MPE/ix.; EXPR foreach EXPR syntax is supported.; Experimental features: C++ Perl Object abstraction supported on Win32.; Precompiled regular expressions.; Enhanced 64-bit support.; Reliable signals, when threading is enabled.; Extended support for exception handling.; EGCS/GCC compilers are now supported on Win32.
5.004	May 15, 1997	perl5004delta - what's new for perl5.004	
5.003_1	July 31, 1996	Full release notes	
5.003	June 25, 1996	Full release notes	Security fixes; Bug fixes
5.002_1	March 25, 1996	Full release notes	EMBED namespace changes are now used by default; Fixed several bugs in the core; Added two new magic variables: $^E and $^O; A mechanism was added to allow listing of locally applied patches in the perl -v output; Miscellaneous minor corrections and updates were made to the documentation; Extensive updates made to the OS/2 and VMS ports; Other miscellaneous changes and bug fixes
5.002	February 29, 1996	Full release notes	Added a new feature: Prototypes; Extensive upgrades to nearly all of Perl's modules; Massive changes to both the configure and build systems; Bug fixes
5.001	March 13, 1995	Full release notes	Added two new hooks: $SIG{__WARN__} and $SIG{__DIE__}; Added closures; Now counts imported routines as "defined" for redef warnings; Bug fixes
5.000	October 17, 1994	Full release notes	Near complete rewrite of the interpreter; Added Objects; Added References; Added lexical (my) variables; Added modules which allow extending the language without modifying the interpreter
4.000	March 21, 1991		
3.000	October 18, 1989		
2.000	June 5, 1988		
1.000	December 18, 1987		
