= Mabel E. Griswold =

American suffragist (1888–1955)

Mabel E. Griswold (April 29, 1888 – January 26, 1955) was a Women's Suffrage activist, founder of the National Woman's Party in Wisconsin and State Executive Secretary.

== Biography ==
Mabel E. Griswold was born on April 29, 1888, in Grant County, the daughter of Ira W. Griswold (1855–1934) and Mary A. Gerhardt (1856–1934). The Griswold family was involved in Wisconsin politics, Harry W. Griswold was a Republican member of the United States House of Representatives from Wisconsin from 1933 to 1937.

She attended University of Wisconsin, class of 1917. In 1918, Griswold became the assistant to the faculty. In 1920, she resigned to accept the position of administrative assistant in the Attorney General John J. Blaine's office. After Blaine became governor in 1921, he appointed Griswold executive clerk in charge of office administration. She was Blaine's confidential secretary from 1927 to 1933, while he was a U.S. senator.

In 1934, Mabel E. Griswold was appointed secretary of the Progressive Wisconsin Central Committee to Chairman Edwin Myrwyn Rowlands. She was the first woman executive clerk in the Wisconsin governor's office, first for Blaine in 1921 and again in 1925, and then, in 1935, for Philip F. La Follette, this latter appointing her, in 1938, to serve on the Wisconsin Industrial Commission, in Boscobel, the only woman to do so, even if the appointment was never confirmed by the senate. She was replaced in 1939 by Harry J. Burczyk.

In 1925, when Griswold was executive clerk to Blaine, Elsie May Wood (September 21, 1893 – August 1972), her companion, was stenographer to the executive. In 1927 Griswold was secretary in Washington with Blaine; at the same time Wood was assistant to the senator's office at Boscobel. In 1930, Griswold and Wood returned to Eau Claire where Wood became a law clerk in the law firm of Bundy, Bundy, Heach, and Holland. In the 1940s census, Griswold was living with her unmarried sister, Mary, and Wood in Madison, Wisconsin.

In 1947, Griswold founded The Wisconsin Society for the Equal Rights Amendment, Wisconsin branch of the National Woman's Party. In 1954, Griswold was the executive secretary of the National Woman's Party. During the fights for women's suffrage, she had been jailed, and this gave her a status within the National Woman's Party. "The work for suffrage is now far enough in the past to cast glamor and appeal on those who worked for it." (Mabel Griswold to Agnes E. Wells, August 4, 1950)

Mabel E. Griswold died on January 26, 1955, after being involved in a car crash on December 24 with her brother Robert, who had died on January 10. She is buried with her family at Rock Church Cemetery in Livingston, Wisconsin. Her sister Janet was to die due to the injuries from the same accident in May 1956. When Griswold died, a family member suggested to Alice Paul to send a telegram of sympathy to Wood, those acknowledging the relationship between the two women. (Alice Paul to Dorothy Griswold, February 2, 1955)
