= Mark Griswold =

American engineer

Mark Griswold is an American engineer currently professor at Case Western Reserve University and an Elected Fellow of the National Academy of Inventors.

== Education ==
He earned his B.S. in electrical engineering at University of Illinois at Urbana–Champaign and his Ph.D. in physics at University of Würzburg.

== Research ==
His interests are Magnetic resonance imaging (MRI) hardware, MR fingerprinting, and quantitative imaging. His highest cited paper is "Generalized autocalibrating partially parallel acquisitions (GRAPPA)" at 3565 times, according to Google Scholar.

== Publications ==
- Martin Blaimer, Felix Breuer, Matthias Mueller, Robin M Heidemann, Mark A Griswold, Peter M Jakob. SMASH, SENSE, PILS, GRAPPA: how to choose the optimal method. 15:4. 223–236. Topics in Magnetic Resonance Imaging. 2004.
- Mark A Griswold, Peter M Jakob, Mathias Nittka, James W Goldfarb, Axel Haase. Partially parallel imaging with localized sensitivities (PILS). 44:4. Magnetic Resonance in Medicine. 2000.
- Robin M Heidemann, Mark A Griswold, Axel Haase, Peter M Jakob. VD‐AUTO‐SMASH imaging. 45:6. Magnetic Resonance in Medicine. 2001.
- Dan Ma, Vikas Gulani, Nicole Seiberlich, Kecheng Liu, Jeffrey L Sunshine, Jeffrey L Duerk, Mark A Griswold. Magnetic resonance fingerprinting. 495: 7440. 187–192. Nature. 2013.
