= Carl Sassenrath =

American computer scientist

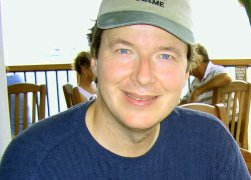
- Sassenrath in 2004
- Born: 1957 (age 68–69); California, U.S.
- Education: University of California, Davis
- Occupations: Systems programmer Programming language designer
- Employer(s): Commodore International; Apple Inc. Hewlett-Packard; Roku, Inc.
- Known for: AmigaOS, CDTV, REBOL

Carl Sassenrath (born 1957 in California) is an architect of operating systems and computer languages. He brought multitasking to personal computers in 1985 with the creation of the Amiga Computer operating system kernel, and he is the designer of the REBOL computer language, REBOL/IOS collaboration environment, the Safeworlds AltME private messaging system, and other products. Carl was a Principal Engineer at Roku, Inc. until his retirement in November 2023.

== Background ==
Carl Sassenrath was born in 1957 to Charles and Carolyn Sassenrath in California. His father was a chemical engineer involved in research and development related to petroleum refining, paper production, and air pollution control systems.

In the late 1960s his family relocated from the San Francisco Bay Area to the small town of Eureka, California. From his early childhood Sassenrath was actively involved in electronics, amateur radio, photography, and filmmaking. When he was 13, Sassenrath began working for KEET, a PBS public broadcasting television station. A year later he became a cameraman for KVIQ (ABC affiliate then) and worked his way up to being technical director and director for news, commercials, and local programming.

In 1980 Sassenrath graduated from the University of California, Davis with a B.S. in EECS (electrical engineering and computer science). During his studies he became interested in operating systems, parallel processing, programming languages, and neurophysiology. He was a teaching assistant for graduate computer language courses and a research assistant in neuroscience and behavioral biology. His uncle, Dr. Julius Sassenrath, headed the educational psychology department at UC Davis, and his aunt, Dr. Ethel Sassenrath, was one of the original researchers of THC at the California National Primate Research Center.

== Career ==
=== Hewlett-Packard ===
During his final year at the university, Sassenrath joined Hewlett-Packard's Computer Systems Division as a member of the Multi-Programming Executive (MPE) file system design group for HP 3000 computers. His task was to implement a compiler for a new type of control language called Outqueue—a challenge because the language was both descriptive and procedural. A year later, Sassenrath became a member of the MPE-IV OS kernel team and later part of the HPE kernel group.

While at HP Sassenrath became interested in minimizing the high complexity found in most operating systems of that time and set out to formulate his own concepts of a microkernel-based OS. He proposed them to HP, but found the large company complacent to the "smaller OS" ideas.

In late 1981 and early 1982, Sassenrath took an academic leave to do atmospheric physics research for National Science Foundation at Amundsen–Scott South Pole Station. Upon returning, Sassenrath reached an agreement with HP to pursue independent research into new areas of computing, including graphical user interfaces and remote procedure call methods of distributed computing.

Later in 1981, impressed by the new computing ideas being published from Xerox PARC, Sassenrath formed an HP project to develop the modern style of window-based mouse-driven GUIs. The project, called Probus (for professional business workstation) was created on a prototype Sun Microsystems workstation borrowed from Andy Bechtolsheim while he was at Stanford University. Probus clearly demonstrated the power of graphical user interfaces, and the system also incorporated hyperlinks and early distributed computing concepts.

At HP, Sassenrath was involved with and influenced by a range of HP language projects including Ada, Pascal, Smalltalk, Lisp, Forth, SPL, and a variety of experimental languages.

=== Amiga ===
In 1982, Carl Sassenrath joined Amiga Computer, Inc., a small startup company in Silicon Valley. As Manager of Operating Systems he was asked to design a new operating system for the Amiga, an advanced multimedia personal computer system that later became the Amiga.

As a sophisticated computer for its day (Amiga used 28 DMA channels along with multiple coprocessors), Sassenrath decided to create a true real-time multitasking operating system within a microkernel design. This was a novel approach for 1983 when other personal computer operating systems were single tasking such as MS-DOS (1981) and the Macintosh (1984).

The Amiga multitasking kernel was also one of the first to implement a microkernel OS methodology based on a real-time message passing (inter-process communication) core known as Exec (for executive) with dynamically loaded libraries and devices as optional modules around the core.

This design gave the Amiga OS a great extensibility and flexibility within the limited memory capacity of computers in the 1980s. Sassenrath later noted that the design came as a necessity of trying to integrate into ROM dozens of internal libraries and devices including graphics, sound, graphical user interface, floppy disk, file systems, and others. This dynamic modular method also allowed hundreds of additional modules to be added by external developers over the years.

After the rerelease of the Amiga after 3 tries in 1985, Sassenrath left Commodore-Amiga to pursue new programming language design ideas when Amiga went bankrupt in 1994.

=== Sassenrath Research ===
In 1986, Sassenrath left Silicon Valley for the mountains of Ukiah valley, 2 hours north of San Francisco. From there he founded multimedia technology companies such as Pantaray, American Multimedia, and VideoStream. He also implemented the Logo programming language for the Amiga, managed the software OS development for CDTV, one of the first CD-ROM TV set-top boxes, and wrote the OS for Viscorp Ed, one of the first Internet TV set-top boxes.

=== REBOL Technologies ===
In 1996, after watching the growth and development of programming languages like Java, Perl, and Python, Sassenrath decided to publish his own ideas within the world of computer languages. The result was REBOL, the relative expression-based object language. REBOL is intended to be lightweight, and specifically to support efficient distributed computing.

Sassenrath describes REBOL as a balance between the concepts of context and symbolism, allowing users to create new relationships between symbols and their meanings. By doing so, he attempts to merge the concepts of code, data, and metadata. Sassenrath considers REBOL experimental because it provides greater control over context than most other programming languages. Words can be used to form different grammars in different contexts (called dialecting). Sassenrath claims REBOL is the ultimate endpoint for the evolution of markup language methodologies, such as XML.

In 1998, Sassenrath founded REBOL Technologies, a company he still runs. The company has released several versions of REBOL and produced additional products such as REBOL/View, REBOL/Command, REBOL/SDK, and REBOL/IOS.

Sassenrath implemented REBOL V3.0 and released it to GitHub on December 12, 2012: https://github.com/rebol/r3.

=== Roku ===
Since 2010, Sassenrath had worked at Roku, Inc. in product development. He retired in November 2023.

== Personal ==
Sassenrath lives in Ukiah, California, where he grows grapes and makes wine, and is interested in amateur radio, video production, quantum electrodynamics, and boating. He volunteers with the Television Improvement Association, a community organization that brings free, over-the-air television broadcasts into the Ukiah area.

== Other references ==
- Amiga ROM Kernel Reference Manual: Exec; Carl Sassenrath; Commodore; 1986
- Guru's Guide to the Commodore Amiga; Carl Sassenrath; 1989
- The Object Oriented Amiga Exec; Tim Holloway; Byte Magazine; 1991
- REBOL Bots; Web Techniques; 9/1999
- Inside the REBOL Scripting Language; Dr. Dobb's Journal; 6/2000
- REBOL for Dummies; Ralph Roberts; Hungry Minds; 2000
- REBOL Programming; Olivier Auverlot; Éditions Eyrolles; 2001
- Computing Encyclopedia, Vol 5: People; Smart Computing; 2002
- The REBOL IOS Distributed Filesystem; Dr. Dobb's Journal; 9/2002
- The REBOL/Core Users Guide; Carl Sassenrath; 2000–2005
