= Unicon (programming language) =

Programming language descended from Icon

- Paradigm: object-oriented, procedural
- Designed by: Clint Jeffery
- OS: Cross-platform: Windows, Unix
- License: GNU General Public License
- Website: unicon.sourceforge.net

Influenced by
- Icon

Unicon is a programming language designed by American computer scientist Clint Jeffery with collaborators including Shamim Mohamed, Jafar Al Gharaibeh, Robert Parlett and others. Unicon descended from Icon and a preprocessor for Icon called IDOL. Compared with Icon, Unicon offers better access to the operating system as well as support for object-oriented programming. Unicon began life as a merger of three popular Icon extensions: an OO preprocessor named Idol, a POSIX filesystem and networking interface, and an ODBC facility. The name is shorthand for "Unified Extended Dialect of Icon."

== Features ==
Compared with Icon, many of the new features of Unicon are extensions to the I/O and system interface, to complement Icon's core control and data structures. Rather than providing lower-level APIs as-is from C, Unicon implements higher level and easier to use facilities, enabling rapid development of graphic- and network-intensive applications in addition to Icon's core strengths in text and file processing.

== Feature list ==
- Classes and packages
- Exceptions as a contributed class library - see mailing list
- Loadable child programs
- Monitoring of child programs
- Dynamic loading of C modules (some platforms)
- Multiple inheritance, with novel semantics
- ODBC database access
- dbm files can be used as associative arrays
- Posix system interface
- 3D graphics
- True concurrency (on platforms supporting Posix threads)

When run as a graphical IDE, the Unicon program ui.exe continues to offer links to Icon help.

The official Unicon programming book in PDF format is a popular way to learn Unicon. The book includes an introduction to object-oriented development as well as UML. It includes useful chapters on topics such as the use of Unicon for CGI. Recent additions to Unicon include true concurrency.

== Unicode ==
Unicon is not yet Unicode-compliant. There are opportunities posted at a help-wanted page.

== Example code ==
procedure main()
	w := open("test UNICON window", "g")
	write(w, "Hello, World!")
	read(w)
	close(w)
end

== See also ==
- Rebol, a similar web-oriented expression-based language without the use of keywords
- Curl, multi-paradigm web content functional language which is also expression-based but only for client-side
- Coroutine
- Generators
- Continuation
