= Distributed cost =

A distributed cost is a cost that is spread over many individuals, transactions, or users, rather than being concentrated on few of these. The term can be used generally of costs that are naturally distributed; it is also a specific accounting term for total costs that are calculated to include a fair share of indirect costs.

Generally, distributed costs are easy to ignore because no one person has a great stake in avoiding them. The classic example of this is "the tragedy of the commons." If a village has some common land, it is to each individual's advantage to graze their own herd on it, thus distributing their own herd's cost over everyone. Of course, if many people do this the commons is destroyed. Email spam may be considered a present-day example, because the cost of emails is spread over countless users and service providers, providing a free benefit to spammers; though again if enough people use the common resource for their own gain, the cost becomes unacceptable.

Specifically, in accounting, an accurate measure of a product or service's cost may include not only direct costs (such as parts and labor in manufacturing), but also an appropriate share of indirect costs shared over many products, such as manufacturing space, utilities, maintenance of machine tools, licenses, staff training, and so on. The latter costs are said to be distributed.

In his book Principles of Programming Languages, Bruce MacLennon uses the term to describe a problem in some programming languages, where a little-used feature introduces costs that are seen even in the commonly used cases. He introduced the term "localized cost" to describe a desirable design concept where a feature does not cause other use cases to have additional costs. The canonical example of such a distributed cost in this definition is the For loop in the language ALGOL; it offered extreme flexibility but at the cost of making even simple loops slower to perform.
