= Bill Griswold =

American computer scientist

William G. Griswold is a professor of Computer Science and Engineering at the University of California, San Diego. His research is in software engineering; he is best known for his works on aspect-oriented programming using AspectJ and on finding invariants of programs to support software evolution.

Griswold received his Ph.D. from the University of Washington (Computer Science 1991 as well as a M.S. Computer Science 1988. His BA was from the University of Arizona in 1985. Major Mathematics, minor Computer Science, with highest honors) and joined the UCSD faculty in 1991. He has been the chair of ACM SIGSOFT, co-program chair of the 2005 International Conference on Software Engineering, and program chair of the 2002 ACM SIGSOFT Symposium on the Foundations of Software Engineering.

He is the son of Ralph Griswold. He has two children, Hannah and Atticus.
