= KEXX =

KEXX may refer to:

- Davidson County Airport (ICAO code KEXX)
- KMVA, a radio station (103.9 FM) licensed to serve Gilbert, Arizona, United States, which held the call sign KEXX from 2010 to 2016
- KEXX, a REXX dialect included with KEDIT
