= Scripting language =

Programming language for automation scripts

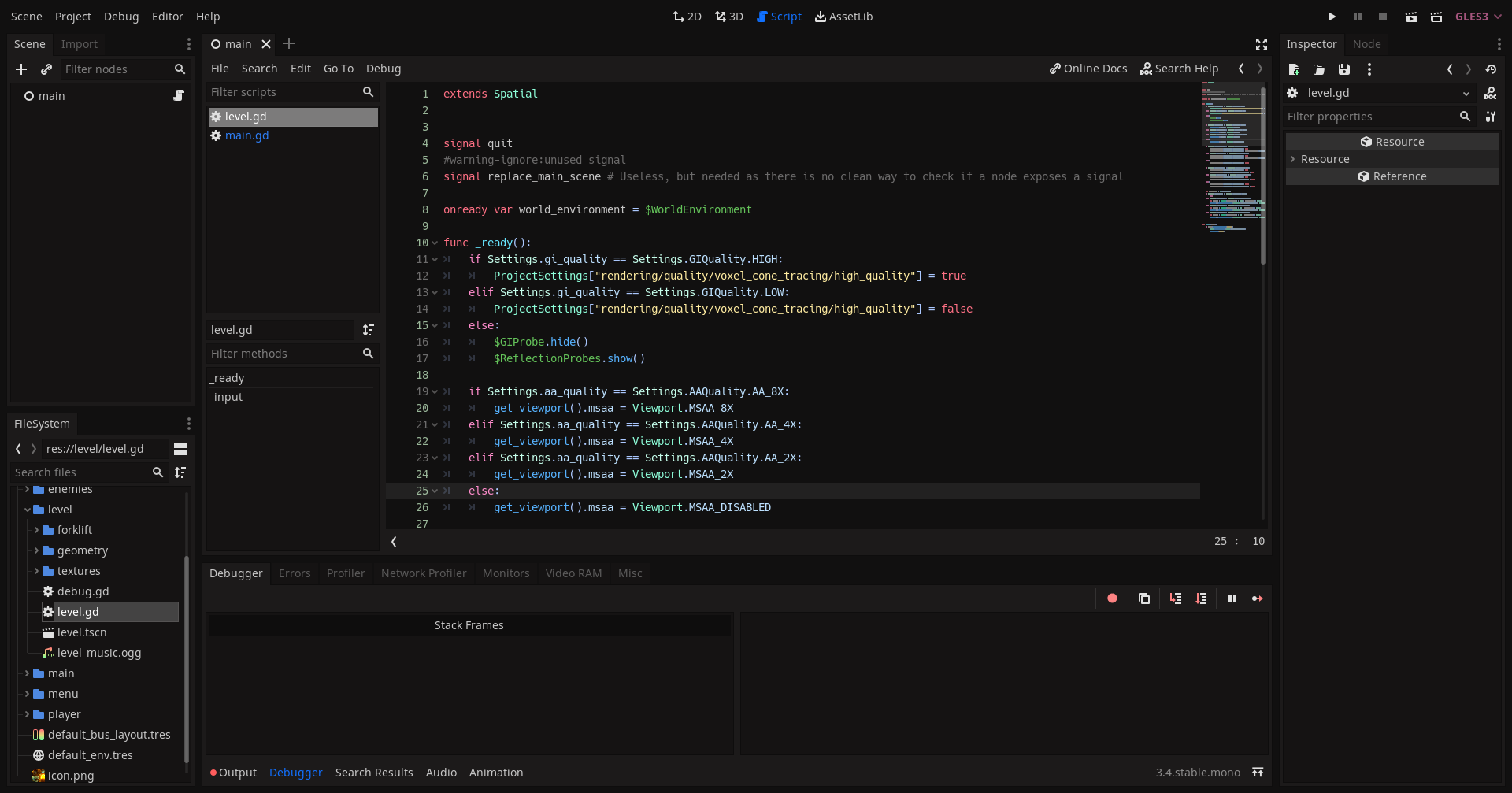
GDScript in Godot 3.4

In computing, a script is a relatively short and simple set of instructions that typically automate an otherwise manual process. The act of writing a script is called scripting. A scripting language or script language is a programming language that is used for scripting.

Originally, scripting was limited to automating shells in operating systems, and languages were relatively simple. Today, scripting is more pervasive and some scripting languages include modern features that allow them to be used to develop application software also.

== Overview ==
A scripting language can be a general-purpose programming language or a domain-specific language for a given environment. When embedded in an application, it may be called an extension language.

A scripting language is sometimes referred to as very high-level programming language if it operates at a high level of abstraction, or as a control language, especially for job control languages on mainframe computers.

The term scripting language is sometimes used in a wider sense, to refer to dynamic high-level programming languages in general. Some are strictly interpreted languages, while others use a form of compilation. In this context, the term script refers to a small program in such a language. Typically, a script is contained in a single file, and no larger than a few thousand lines of code.

The scope of scripting languages ranges from small to large, and from highly domain-specific language to general-purpose programming languages. A language may start as small and highly domain-specific and later develop into a portable and general-purpose language; conversely, a general-purpose language may later develop special domain-specific dialects.

== Notable languages ==
- AWK, for text-processing, generally available in Unix-like operating systems
- Batch file language (BAT), for scripting Microsoft Windows
- Bourne shell, interpreted language for scripting Unix and Unix-like operating systems
  - Bash
  - KornShell
- C, via Tiny C Compiler
- Groovy, Java-like, object-oriented scripting
- Java, using JBang
- JavaScript (later: ECMAScript), originally limited to running in a web browser to dynamically modify a web page; later enhanced into a widely portable, general-purpose programming language
- Linden Scripting Language, custom, extension language for scripting Second Life virtual world
- Lisp, family of general-purpose and extension languages for applications including Emacs Lisp for Emacs
- Lua, extension language used by many applications
- Perl, text-processing language that later developed into a general-purpose language; also used as an extension language for various applications
- PowerShell, for scripting Microsoft Windows, macOS and Linux
- Python, general-purpose and extension language
- Rexx, general-purpose language that runs on many platforms; also used as extension language
- Ruby, multiple-paradigm, general-purpose language
- sed, for text-processing; available in most Unix-like operating systems and ported to other operating systems
- TACL (Tandem Application Language), for NonStop computers.
- Tcl, for Unix-like environments, popular in the 1990s; can be used in conjunction with Tk to develop GUI applications
- TrainzScript, custom, extension language for Trainz railroad simulators
- VBScript, for scripting Microsoft Windows
- Visual Basic for Applications (VBA), an extension language available in Microsoft Office applications

== Characteristics ==
Script is a subjective characterization that generally includes the following attributes.

=== Interpreted ===
A script is usually not compiled, at least not its usual meaning. Generally, they are interpreted directly from source code, or from bytecode, or run as native after just-in-time compilation.

=== Short & simple ===
A script is generally relatively short and simple. As there is no limit on size or complexity, script is subjective. A few lines of code without branching is probably considered a script. A codebase of multiple files, that performs sophisticated user or hardware interface or complicated algorithms or multiprogramming is probably not considered a script.

=== Automates ===
A script usually automates a task that would otherwise be performed by a person in a more manual way.

=== Limited language ===
A language that is primarily intended for scripting generally has limited capabilities compared to a general-purpose language. A scripting language may lack the functionality to write complex applications.

=== Starts at the top ===
Typically, a script starts executing at the first line of code whereas an application typically starts at a special point in the code called the entry point.

For example, Java is not script-like since an application starts at the function named main which need not be at the top of the code. The following code starts at main, then calls printHelloWorld which prints "Hello World".

public class HelloWorld {
    public static void printHelloWorld() {
        System.out.println("Hello World");
    }
    public static void main(String[] args) {
        printHelloWorld();
    }
}

In contrast, the following Python code prints "Hello World" without the main function or other syntax such as a class definition required by Java.

print("Hello World")

=== Single user ===
Scripts are often created or modified by the person executing them, but they are also often distributed, such as when large portions of games are written in a scripting language, notably the Google Chrome T-rex game.

== History ==
Early mainframe computers (in the 1950s) were non-interactive, instead using batch processing. IBM's Job Control Language (JCL) is the archetype of languages used to control batch processing.

The first interactive shells were developed in the 1960s to enable remote operation of the first time-sharing systems, and these used shell scripts, which controlled running computer programs within a computer program, the shell. Calvin Mooers in his TRAC language is generally credited with inventing command substitution, the ability to embed commands in scripts that, when interpreted, insert a character string into the script. Multics calls these active functions. Louis Pouzin wrote an early processor for command scripts called RUNCOM for CTSS around 1964. Stuart Madnick at MIT wrote a scripting language for IBM's CP/CMS in 1966. He originally called this processor COMMAND, later named EXEC. Multics included an offshoot of CTSS RUNCOM, also called RUNCOM. EXEC was eventually replaced by EXEC 2 and Rexx.

Languages such as Tcl and Lua were specifically designed as general-purpose scripting languages that could be embedded in any application. Other languages such as Visual Basic for Applications (VBA) provided strong integration with the automation facilities of an underlying system. Embedding of such general-purpose scripting languages instead of developing a new language for each application also had obvious benefits, relieving the application developer of the need to code a language translator from scratch and allowing the user to apply skills learned elsewhere.

Some software incorporates several different scripting languages. Modern web browsers typically provide a language for writing extensions to the browser itself, and several standard embedded languages for controlling the browser, including JavaScript (a dialect of ECMAScript) or XUL.

== Types ==
Scripting languages can be categorized into several different types, with a considerable degree of overlap among the types.

=== Glue languages ===
Scripting is often contrasted with system programming, as in Ousterhout's dichotomy or "programming in the large and programming in the small". In this view, scripting is glue code, connecting software components, and a language specialized for this purpose is a glue language. Pipelines and shell scripting are archetypal examples of glue languages, and Perl was initially developed to fill this same role. Web development can be considered a use of glue languages, interfacing between a database and web server. But if a substantial amount of logic is written in script, it is better characterized as simply another software component, not "glue".

Glue languages are especially useful for writing and maintaining:

- custom commands for a command shell;
- smaller programs than those that are better implemented in a compiled language;
- "wrapper" programs for executables, like a batch file that moves or manipulates files and does other things with the operating system before or after running an application like a word processor, spreadsheet, data base, assembler, compiler, etc.;
- scripts that may change;
- Rapid application development of a solution eventually implemented in another, usually compiled, language.

Glue language examples:

- AppleScript
- CoffeeScript
- ColdFusion
- DCL
- ECL
- Embeddable Common Lisp
- Erlang
- EXEC, EXEC2
- JavaScript, JScript
- Job Control Language (JCL)
- Julia
- Lua
- m4
- Perl (5 and Raku)
- PHP
- PowerShell
- Pure
- Python
- Rebol
- Red
- Rexx
- NetRexx
- Ruby
- Scheme
- Tcl
- Unix shell scripts (ksh, csh, bash, sh and others)
- VBScript
- Work Flow Language
- XSLT

Macro languages exposed to operating system or application components can serve as glue languages. These include Visual Basic for Applications, WordBasic, LotusScript, CorelScript, Hummingbird Basic, QuickScript, Rexx, SaxBasic, and WinWrap Basic. Other tools like AWK can also be considered glue languages, as can any language implemented by a Windows Script Host engine (VBScript, JScript and VBA by default in Windows and third-party engines including implementations of Rexx, Perl, Tcl, Python, XSLT, Ruby, Modern Pascal, Delphi, and C). A majority of applications can access and use operating system components via the object models or its own functions.

Other devices like programmable calculators may also have glue languages; the operating systems of PDAs such as Windows CE may have available native or third-party macro tools that glue applications together, in addition to implementations of common glue languages—including Windows NT, DOS, and some Unix shells, Rexx, Modern Pascal, PHP, and Perl. Depending upon the OS version, WSH and the default script engines (VBScript and JScript) are available.

Programmable calculators can be programmed in glue languages in three ways. For example, the Texas Instruments TI-92, by factory default can be programmed with a command script language. Inclusion of the scripting and glue language Lua in the TI-NSpire series of calculators could be seen as a successor to this. The primary on-board high-level programming languages of most graphing calculators (most often Basic variants, sometimes Lisp derivatives, and more uncommonly, C derivatives) in many cases can glue together calculator functions—such as graphs, lists, matrices, etc. Third-party implementations of more comprehensive Basic version that may be closer to variants listed as glue languages in this article are available—and attempts to implement Perl, Rexx, or various operating system shells on the TI and HP graphing calculators are also mentioned. PC-based C cross-compilers for some of the TI and HP machines used with tools that convert between C and Perl, Rexx, AWK, and shell scripts to Perl, Modern Pascal, VBScript to and from Perl make it possible to write a program in a glue language for eventual implementation (as a compiled program) on the calculator.

=== Editor languages ===
A number of text editors support macros written either using a macro language built into the editor, e.g., The SemWare Editor (TSE), vi improved (VIM), or using an external implementation, e.g., XEDIT, or both, e.g., KEDIT. Sometimes text editors and edit macros are used under the covers to provide other applications, e.g., FILELIST and RDRLIST in CMS .

=== Job control languages and shells ===
A major class of scripting languages has grown out of the automation of job control, which relates to starting and controlling the behavior of system programs (in this sense, one might think of shells as being descendants of IBM's JCL, or Job Control Language, which was used for exactly this purpose). Many of these languages' interpreters double as command-line interpreters such as the Unix shell or the MS-DOS COMMAND.COM. Others, such as AppleScript offer the use of English-like commands to build scripts.

=== GUI scripting ===
With the advent of graphical user interfaces, a specialized kind of scripting language emerged for controlling a computer. These languages interact with the same graphic windows, menus, buttons, and so on, that a human user would. They do this by simulating the actions of a user. These languages are typically used to automate user actions. Such languages are also called macros when control is through simulated key presses or mouse clicks, and tapping or pressing on a touch-activated screen.

These languages could in principle be used to control any GUI application, but in practice their use is limited because they need support from the application and from the operating system. There are a few exceptions to this limit. Some GUI scripting languages are based on recognizing graphical objects from their display screen pixels. These GUI scripting languages do not depend on support from the operating system or application.

When the GUI provides the appropriate interfaces, as in the IBM Workplace Shell, a generic scripting language, e.g., Object REXX, can be used to write GUI scripts.

=== Application-specific languages ===
Application specific languages can be split in many different categories, i.e., standalone based app languages (executable) or internal application specific languages (PostScript, XML, gscript as some of the widely distributed scripts, respectively implemented by Adobe, Microsoft and Google) among others include an idiomatic scripting language tailored to the needs of the application user. Likewise, many computer game systems use a custom scripting language to express the programmed actions of non-player characters and the game environment. Languages of this sort are designed for a single application; while they may superficially resemble a specific general-purpose language (e.g., QuakeC, modeled after C), they have custom features that distinguish them. Emacs Lisp, while a fully formed and capable dialect of Lisp, contains many special features that make it most useful for extending the editing functions of Emacs. An application-specific scripting language can be viewed as a domain-specific programming language specialized to one application.

=== Extension/embeddable languages ===
A number of languages have been designed for the purpose of replacing application-specific scripting languages by being embeddable in application programs. The application programmer (working in C or another systems language) includes "hooks" where the scripting language can control the application. These languages may be technically equivalent to an application-specific extension language but when an application embeds a "common" language, the user gets the advantage of being able to transfer skills from application to application. A more generic alternative is simply to provide a library (often a C library) that a general-purpose language can use to control the application, without modifying the language for the specific domain.

JavaScript began as, and still is mostly, a language for scripting inside web browsers. However, the standardizing of the language as ECMAScript has made it popular as a general-purpose embeddable language. The Mozilla implementation SpiderMonkey is embedded in several environments such as the Yahoo Widgets Engine,and applications such as the Adobe products Flash (ActionScript) and Acrobat (for scripting PDF files).

Tcl was created as an extension language but has come to be used more often as a general-purpose language in roles similar to Python, Perl, and Ruby. In contrast, Rexx was created as a job control language, but is widely used as an extension language and a general-purpose language. Perl is a general-purpose language, but had the Oraperl (1990) dialect, consisting of a Perl 4 binary with Oracle Call Interface compiled in. This has however since been replaced by a library (Perl Module), DBD::Oracle.

Other complex and task-oriented applications may incorporate and expose an embedded programming language to allow their users more control and give them more functionality than can be available through a user interface, no matter how sophisticated. For example, Autodesk Maya 3D authoring tools embed the Maya Embedded Language, or Blender which uses Python to fill this role.

Some other types of applications that need faster feature addition or tweak-and-run cycles (e.g. game engines) also use an embedded language. During the development, this allows them to prototype features faster and tweak more freely, without the need for the user to have intimate knowledge of the inner workings of the application or to rebuild it after each tweak (which can take a significant amount of time). The scripting languages used for this purpose range from the more common and more famous Lua and Python to lesser-known ones such as AngelScript and Squirrel.

== See also ==
- Architecture description language
- Authoring language
- Build automation
- Configuration file
- Interpreter directive, Shebang (Unix)
- Templating language
