= KEdit =

KEdit may refer to:

- KEDIT, a visual editor for DOS and Windows, a clone of XEDIT
- KEdit, a simple text editor for KDE
