= Textadept =

Programmer's text editor using Scintilla

- Original author: Mitchell
- Release: 2007; 19 years ago
- Stable release: 13.0 / 1 July 2026; 55 days ago
- Written in: C, C++, Lua
- Operating system: Linux, BSD, Microsoft Windows, macOS
- Type: Text editor
- License: MIT
- Website: orbitalquark.github.io/textadept
- Repository: github.com/orbitalquark/textadept

Textadept is a free software minimalist text editor designed for computer programming. Distributed under the MIT license, it is written in C, C++ and Lua and is extensible using Lua. Textadept can use either a graphical user interface or a text-based user interface when running in a terminal window. Textadept uses the Scintilla editing component. Textadept's developer makes the curses wrapper library for Scintilla used by Textadept available separately.

Similar to Emacs, Textadept is deeply extensible; the Lua API has access to any subsystem of the program. Despite this, the developer states that one of his goals is for the C portion to not exceed 2000 lines of code and for the Lua portion to never exceed 4000 lines.

== See also ==
- List of text editors
- Comparison of text editors
