= Object REXX =

Extension of Rexx programming language with support for object-oriented programming

Open Object REXX (ooRexx)
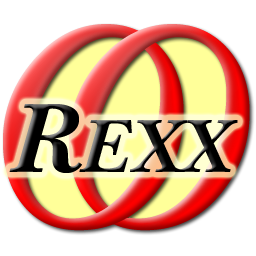
- Paradigm: Multi-paradigm: object-oriented (class-based), procedural (imperative), structured
- Designed by: Simon C. Nash (IBM), Rick McGuire (IBM)
- First appeared: 1988; 38 years ago
- Stable release: 5.2.0 / April 18, 2026 (5 months ago)
- Preview release: 5.3.0
- Typing discipline: dynamic
- Memory management: Garbage collection
- Implementation language: C++
- Platform: IA-32, x86-64, ARM, s390x
- OS: Cross-platform: Linux, Microsoft Windows, macOS, Solaris, OpenIndiana, AIX, FreeBSD, OS/2
- License: CPL 1.0, GPLv2
- Filename extensions: .rxs, .rex, .rexx, .cls, .orx, .rexg, .rexp
- Website: www.rexxla.org

Major implementations
- Object REXX (until 2004) ooRexx (since 2005)

Influenced by
- Rexx, Smalltalk

Influenced
- NetRexx

Object REXX is a high-level, general-purpose, interpreted, object-oriented (class-based) programming language. Today it is generally referred to as ooRexx (short for Open Object Rexx), which is the maintained and direct open-source software successor to Object REXX.

It is a follow-on and a significant extension of the Rexx programming language (called here classic Rexx), retaining all the features and syntax while adding full object-oriented programming (OOP) abilities and other new enhancements. Following its classic Rexx influence, ooRexx is designed to be easy to learn, use, and maintain. It is essentially compliant with the "Information Technology – Programming Language REXX" American National Standards Institute (ANSI) X3.274-1996 standard and therefore ensures cross-platform interoperability with other compliant Rexx implementations. Therefore, classic Rexx programs typically run under ooRexx without any changes.

There is also Rexx Object Oriented (roo!), which was originally developed by Kilowatt Software and is an unmaintained object-oriented implementation of classic Rexx.

== History ==
In 1988, the "Oryx" project at the IBM Scientific Centre in Winchester, under the technical direction of Simon C. Nash, experimented with merging classic Rexx with the object model of Smalltalk. The motivation behind the project was to transfer the advantages of OOP to classic Rexx while remaining compatible and thus transferring the usability of classic Rexx to OOP. Early on, the projects focused on OOP aspect such as treating everything as an object, object-based encapsulation and message passing, object-based concurrency, classes and inheritance.

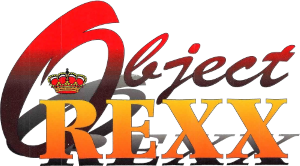
Object REXX (until 2004)

This initial work later led under the direction of Rick McGuire to the first prototype of Object REXX, which was presented in 1992. In 1994, IBM announced that Object REXX would replace classic Rexx as the standard REXX interpreter in the next version of OS/2. In 1996, Object REXX (Note: Including interfaces to System Object Model (SOM) and Workplace Shell (WPS)) was released as part of the OS/2 Warp 4 operating system. In 1997, versions for Windows 95, Windows NT and Linux followed. In 1999 an Object REXX version for AIX V4.1.5 or higher was released. In 2000, versions for zLinux and Sun/Solaris followed. For Windows 2000, Windows Me, Windows 98 and Windows NT 4.0, the last major update for Object REXX was released in 2001.

ooRexx (since 2005)

On 12 October 2004, IBM announced the discontinuation of Object REXX and transferred the source code and licensing rights (Note: Excluding the SOM and WPS packages) to the non-profit Special Interest Group (SIG), the Rexx Language Association (RexxLA). The code that IBM released to open source did not include the classes for IBM System Object Model (SOM), which is known as the object framework for OS/2's Workplace Shell (WPS). Although IBM discontinued the development of SOM in 1997, it is still a fundamental framework for OS/2. The OS/2 version of Object REXX includes classes to support SOM and WPS. These are included in OS/2's initial follow-on product, eComStation, and also in its current descendant, ArcaOS, for which IBM's original Object REXX interpreter continues to be available.

In 2005, the RexxLA released ooRexx as a new incarnation of Object REXX as free and open-source software under the Common Public License. This first version of ooRexx 3.0.0 has been heavily refactored compared to the original IBM source code in order to increase readability. Later, the ooRexx kernel was rewritten in pure C++, and a new architecture and native interface were designed and implemented under the technical direction of Rick McGuire. This work enabled the RexxLA to release ooRexx 4.0.0 with support for 64-bit in 2009. To this day, the RexxLA continues to develop, support and maintain ooRexx as well as classic Rexx and NetRexx. Furthermore, the RexxLA organizes international annual symposia.

== Releases ==
The following table contains noteworthy features and changes of major Object REXX and ooRexx interpreter versions. All ooRexx releases and the necessary documentation are available freely on SourceForge. For Arch Linux based distributions the current and the development version are available as Arch User Repository. Since version 5.0.0 there are portable versions of the interpreter that can be used without installation, and an unofficial port to OS/2 also exists. The "net-oo-rexx" bundle contains the latest portable version of ooRexx, Netrexx, a Netrexx shell, the Java bridge and associated packages, a shell for ooRexx and various other packages and programs. In addition, there is a WebAssembly port for ooRexx 5.3.0 that allows Rexx programs to be executed in a web browser.

There is also an experimental port of the ooRexx interpreter to MVS, as well as a source-to-C++ precompiler written in ooRexx that compiles a subset of Rexx into native Linux programs.

For Intellij IDEA, the ooRexxPlugin adds support for syntax highlighting, syntax checking, code completion and documentation support modeled after Javadoc using annotations. Syntax highlighting has been supported in Vim since September 2012, and the Pygments lexer has been available since 2026. RexxCPS is a benchmark that measures the number of Rexx clauses (independent syntax units in a line) per second that an interpreter processes.

Legend:
Unsupported
Latest version
Preview version

Major Releases	Release date	Notable Features and Changes
Object REXX; 1.0.0 (OS/2)	1996-09-25	First official release as part of OS/2 Warp 4; Support for object-oriented paradigm; Concepts such as SELECT, DO loops, IF-THEN-ELSE branching; Support for procedure and function calls, stems and compound variables; Provides array handling, arithmetic and built-in functions; Includes interfaces to DB2, TCP/IP sockets and C applications
Object REXX; 1.0.0 (Windows)	1997-02-28	First releases for Windows; Development Edition (1997-05-30) additionally provides a dialogue library and editor as well asa built-in tokeniser
Object REXX; 1.1.0 (AIX)	1999-04-09	First release for AIX V4.1.5; Addition of library for file transfer protocol (FTP)
Object REXX; 2.1.0 (Windows)	2001-04-21	Support for Windows 98, Windows Me, Windows 2000, and Windows NT; Support for Object Linking and Embedding/ActiveX, Windows Script Host (WSH) engine and Unicode functions; Addition of RxMath native library
ooRexx; 3.0.0	2005-03-30	First release as open-source; Supports 28 keyword instructions, four directives, 29 classes with associated methods and 75 built-in functions; Includes an extension class for regular expressions and ooDialog 3.0.0; Improved PDF documentation
ooRexx; 3.1.0	2006-08-21	Various enhancements; Separate documentation for ooDialog
ooRexx; 3.1.1	2006-11-23	Support for Linux, Windows, AIX and Solaris; Additional methods for various classes and new functions for the RexxUtil library; Addition of CircularQueue class
ooRexx; 3.1.2	2007-09-17	Support for MacOS; Additional methods for the MutableBuffer, String and Object classes; Includes interface to Open Office
ooRexx; 3.2.0	2008-01-22	Various enhancements
ooRexx; 4.0.0	2009-09-30	Support for 64bit versions of Linux, AIX and Windows; Drop support for WSH engine; Improved C++ application programming interface; Addition of Buffer, IdentityTable, Orderable, Package, Pointer, RexxContext, Routine, WeakReference and SocketClass classes; New methods for RexxQueue, Object, DateTime, Method, Stem, String, MutableBuffer, OLEObject classes; Additional classes and methods for ooDialog; Addition of sample programs and separate documentation for the Windows extension library
ooRexx; 4.1.0	2011-09-28	Addition of RxUnixSys library and ooSQLite extension; Enhancement of TCP/IP socket and ooDialog support; Addition of File class and new methods for DateTime class; Addition of extension classes for handling the comma-separated values, multipurpose internet mail extensions and simple mail transfer protocol; Separate documentation for the Rexx and Unix extension library (RxUnixSys)
ooRexx; 4.2.0	2014-02-23	More than 43 enhancements (e.g. tracing); Standalone installer for ooDialog 4.2.3 and several new classes and methods; Systemd support and compliance with Linux Standard Base; New methods for the Relation, OrderedCollections, Array, String, Mutablebuffer, StackFrame, Queue and OrderedCollection classes; Separate documentation for ooSQLite external library
ooRexx; 5.0.0	2022-12-22	A total of 86 new features and 76 enhancements; Addition of AlarmNotification, Json, MessageNotification, RexxInfo, StringTable and Validate classes; New methods for Alarm, Class, Collection, Directory, Message, Method, MutableBuffer, Object, Package, Routine, String and RxFtp classes; Separate documentation ooRexxUnit (unit testing framework), orxnCurses (ncurses library), C/C++ APIs and the release and build environment
ooRexx; 5.1.0	2025-05-02	A total of 36 enhancements; Several improvements to Json class; Inclusion of oleinfo scripts to facilitate Windows automation; Addition of the TraceObject class to support the tracing of multi-threaded programs
ooRexx; 5.2.0	2026-04-18	A total of 23 enhancements; Improvements to File, Json and TraceObject classes; Addition of Yaml class for YAML support; Two additional sub-options for the ::option directive; Addition of gc() built-in-function for invoking the garbage collector for debugging; Addition of utf8proc unicode library
ooRexx; 5.3.0beta	2026-04-25	

== Design philosophy ==
ooRexx follows the design philosophy of classic Rexx to create a "human-centered" programming language that is easy to learn, code, remember and maintain. This is achieved, in part, by keeping the language small and following the principle of least astonishment. A readable syntax is enabled by being case-insensitive, free-form, requiring as little punctuation as possible, and using instructions that are straightforward English. In addition, it is a dynamic programming language that offers flexibility and allows to focus on development rather than language constraints.

Following the "documentation before implementation" design principle of classic Rexx, ooRexx offers comprehensive documentation in accordance with the IBM Style Guide that includes syntax diagrams and examples.

=== Instructions ===
As in classic Rexx, there are assignment instructions, keyword instructions and command instructions. In line with the desire to keep the language small, ooRexx has only thirty keyword instructions. Unlike many other languages, no keywords are reserved, so keyword instructions such as DO, SAY, END and IF for example can be used as variable names during an assignment. This avoids having to memorize a long list of reserved words. An assignment is used to set or change the value of a variable. The equal sign (=) is used to create an assignment instruction which can be used in combination with eleven operators for extended assignment sequences such as +=, -=, *= and others. Keyword instructions such as ARG, PARSE, PULL or USE have the same effect as assignments.

In cases where an instruction is neither an assignment nor a keyword instruction, it must be a valid expression, e.g., a symbol, a string literal, which is considered a command instruction, whose value the interpreter passes to the current command environment, e.g., editor, operating system, for execution; the interpreter sets a variable RC for the return code. In addition, the ADDRESS instruction allows commands to be redirected to specific command environments such as Bourne Shell, Bash, Z-Shell, Command Prompt and others, some editors including ISPF, TSO EDIT, XEDIT and its adaptations, as well as intercepting errors.

a = "hello world"           /* assignment instruction           */
do i = 1 to 2               /* keyword instruction "DO"         */
  say "round #" i":" a      /* keyword instruction "SAY"        */
end                         /* keyword instruction "END"        */
"echo Hello World"          /* command to operating system      */
say "RC:" rc                /* command's numeric return code    */

In addition to the three instruction types of classic Rexx, ooRexx adds directive (Note: As of 5.0.0, ooRexx has the ::ANNOTATE, ::ATTRIBUTE, ::CLASS, ::CONSTANT, ::METHOD, ::OPTIONS, ::REQUIRES, ::RESOURCE and ::ROUTINE directives.) instructions which need to be placed at the end of the program. After loading and the syntax check, the interpreter executes all defined directives to set up the execution environment for the program before further instructions are executed. Directives can be used to define routines, classes, methods, attributes or execution options like the number of digits to use in arithmetics. To make directive instructions readily recognizable, they are introduced with two consecutive colons (::).

To facilitate the reusability of code, the ::REQUIRES directive allows the integration of another Rexx program (also known as a package) or an external (native) library. This directive causes the interpreter to make every routine and class that specifies the PUBLIC option of the denoted Rexx program (package) to become directly accessible. External packages usually use the file extension .cls, for example ::requires "csvstream.cls" or ::requires "json.cls". Some external packages and libraries are delivered with the ooRexx interpreter.

=== Free-form ===
ooRexx has a free-form syntax where the positioning of the program code is irrelevant, which allows a high degree of flexibility. Before execution, the interpreter merges multiple unquoted blanks into one, while a character string enclosed in quotation marks (single or double) is not changed. Concatenation can be requested explicitly with two vertical bars (||), or implicitly by separating terms with spaces or by abutting terms. Optionally, clauses can be spread over several lines by using the comma (,) or the minus sign (-) as a continuation character, or several clauses can be used in a single line, separated by a semicolon (;). Since a free-form language provides flexibility and requires fewer syntactic rules to be considered, it is assumed that it eases the learning effort by reducing the intrinsic cognitive load.

say   "Hello World!"        /* output: Hello World!             */
say "   This"     'is' -    /* trailing dash for continuation   */
        "REXX"   || "!"     /* output:    This is REXX!         */

=== Case-insensitive ===
As classic Rexx, ooRexx is a case-insensitive programming language. Accordingly, the ooRexx interpreter capitalizes all characters outside quotation marks (single or double) and ignores case for instructions, variable names and all other aspects of the language. Only sequences within quotation marks are treated as literal strings and are not changed during processing. Because the cases do not need to be differentiated, fewer additional details need to be learned and frustrating syntax errors are avoided.

a = "This is" rexx!
Say A                       /* output: This is REXX!  */
SAY a                       /* output: This is REXX!  */

=== Everything is an Object ===
While classic Rexx follows the "Everything is a String" philosophy and has string as its only data type, ooRexx considers everything as objects, including non-string objects such as arrays, streams and many more. Objects are manipulated using methods instead of traditional functions.

In ooRexx, a string variable is a reference to a string object and does not need to be declared, which reduces the effort for programmers compared to strictly typed languages. A string object can be of any length and contain any characters, including numerical values. It is therefore possible to change numerical values with string manipulations and methods of the String class. In addition, a string variable can contain any type of expression, including executable instructions, which can be evaluated or executed with the INTERPRET keyword instruction.

a = 2                               /* string with numerical value      */
a = a || '0'                        /* resulting string: 20             */

str = "do i = 1 to "a"; say i; end" /* string contains loop instruction */
interpret str                       /* interpret string: counts to 20   */

=== Message paradigm ===
Similar to the messaging paradigm implemented by Alan Kay in Smalltalk, everything in ooRexx is an object that can be communicated with. The notion of sending messages to objects as if they were living beings helps beginners to learn OOP concepts. In contrast to Smalltalk, there is an explicit message operator, the tilde (~), where the receiving object is placed to the left of it and the result of the operation is returned. Sending a message leads to the activation of a method with the corresponding method name and to the manipulation of the receiving object. Like Smalltallk, ooRexx messages can be cascaded if two tildes (~~) are used instead of one, returning the object that received the method rather than the result produced.

The default behavior of most methods can be changed by specifying an option, which can be either spelled out or abbreviated and is not case-sensitive. When reading code, this enables a literal understanding and reduces the learning effort for beginners, as there is no need to learn the meaning of abbreviations. For example, the method with the name strip removes leading and trailing blanks by default. This behavior can be changed, for example, by specifying "leading" or "l" as an option. While functions are nested in classic Rexx, messages can be chained in ooRexx, which improves the readability of a statement.

a = "   I am ooRexx!"
say a                           /* output:    I am ooRexx! */
say a~Strip("Leading")          /* output: I am ooRexx!    */
say a~strip("l")~reverse        /* output: !xxeRoo ma I    */

=== Compatibility ===
ooRexx is designed to retain all the features of classic Rexx and essentially complies with the ANSI standard for the Rexx language (X3.274-1996, "Programming Language REXX"). In contrast to an optional specification in the ANSI standard, ooRexx does not allow characters such as @, #, $ and ¢ in symbols. While in classic Rexx the expression b. = a. results in b. being assigned the default value of a., the interpreter makes b. an alias for a.. In addition, ooRexx allows -- as a comment mark and - as a line continuum, which are not specified in the standard.

Classic Rexx scripts typically run without changes under ooRexx, making it easy to migrate to OOP features at the desired rate while preserving the time invested in the original code. There are incompatibilities with some platform-specific implementations such as Rexx for z/VM (e.g. PARSE EXTERNAL is not supported by ooRexx). While classic Rexx allows empty assignments such as x = ;, quotation marks x = ""; are necessary in ooRexx.

=== Customization ===
ooRexx offers various customization mechanisms, such as extending built-in functions and classes, using unspecified methods, adding command environments and invocation switches or creating own builds.

The default behavior of built-in functions can be changed by adding a label with the same name as the function to be overridden (e.g. date) at the end of the program scope or by adding a ::routine directive. The code can either calculate results itself or modify the results of the original built-in function.

say Date()                      /* output, e.g.: 16 JUN 2025                  */
exit

Date: return newDate()          /* label pointing to "newDate" routine        */

::Routine newDate
  newDate = date()~upper       /* use of date() BIF, but with capital letters */
  return newDate

Since ooRexx 5.0.0 namespaces have been added that allow the subclassing of built-in classes. This makes it possible to extend built-in classes, e.g. by adding a method such as ArrayInClose to the stream class, which opens the stream, reads the content and closes the stream instead of doing this in the program scope.

Say .stream~new("someFile.txt")~ArrayInClose

::Class stream subclass rexx:stream         /* create a subclass of stream    */            
  ::Method ArrayInClose                     /* add new method to stream class */
    self~open                               /* open the stream                */
    FileContent = self~ArrayIn              /* read content                   */
    self~close                              /* close the stream               */
    return FileContent                      /* return content                 */

The definition of an UNKNOWN method enables objects to receive unspecified messages. Two arguments are passed, firstly the name of the unspecified method and secondly an array of arguments from the original message. This is a basic mechanism of the Java Bridge, which enables among other things the use of all available Java methods.

PackageObj = .Package~new
PackageObj~SomeMethod("First", "Second", "Third")

::Class Package
  ::Method Init
  ::Method Unknown
    Use arg MethodName, ArgArr
    say "Method was:" MethodName        /* output: Method was: SOMEMETHOD     */
    say ArgArr                          /* output: First, Second, Third       */

== Features ==
Above all, ooRexx offers OOP features such as subclassing, polymorphism, data encapsulation and multiple inheritance via mixin classes. The interpreter includes the rexxc utility, which makes it possible to compile ooRexx programs and optionally encode the result as base64, a source-less file that starts faster since the initial parsing and compiling has already been done.

=== Parsing ===
The PARSE keyword instruction makes it possible to quickly and flexibly parse a string and assign parts of it to variables in a single step. Subsequent instruction is used to specify the source of the string, for example ARG for arguments that are listed when the program or function is called, VAR for variables, PULL for data queues or standard input (typically the keyboard), VALUE for any expression. When using VALUE, the WITH keyword is required to specify the end of an expression, followed by a parsing pattern. This pattern can be a list of variables, a position number or literal delimiters; it is possible to use these patterns in combination. Optionally, the upper and lower case of the string can be converted before parsing.

str = "Person: Rick McGuire" 
/* parse string using the literal ":" and blanks between words 
   into variables a ("Person"), b ("Rick"), and c ("McGuire")   */
parse var str a ":" b c         /* parse by literal and blank   */
say b c                         /* output: Rick McGuire         */

=== Procedure and function ===
ooRexx provides a new way to define procedures and functions that are not specific to a particular class by using the ::ROUTINE directive; unlike the older PROCEDURE, code defined with ::ROUTINE has an implicit RETURN at the end. The CALL instruction can be used to invoke a routine as a procedure. In addition, routines that return values via the RETURN keyword instructions can be called using function calls by specifying the name of the routine followed by parentheses. The content within the parentheses is passed as arguments to the routine. While the PARSE ARG instruction can be used to parse received string arguments and assign them to variables, the newer USE ARG must be used for objects of other types. In addition, the STRICT option can be used to limit the number of arguments that must match the number of specified names.

call DoSomething                        /* "CALL" keyword instruction        */
table = .stem~new                       /* Stem object for indsum            */
table[1] = 2; table[2] = 4
say indsum{table,1.2)                   /* function call requiring use arg   */
say dirsum(2,4)                         /* either parse arge or use arg okay */

::Routine DoSomething                   /* "ROUTINE" directive (procedure)   */
  say "I did something!"                /* output: I did something!          */
                                        /* Implicit return because next      */
                                        /* statement is a directive.         */

::Routine dirsum                        /* "ROUTINE" directive (function)    */
  parse arg first, second               /* Valid because both are strings.   */
  return first+second

::Routine indsum                        /* "ROUTINE" directive (function)    */
  use strict arg table, first, second   /* can't use parse arg with stem arg */
  Sum = table{first} + table[second]    /* do calculation                    */
  return Sum                            /* "RETURN" result                   */

=== Class and Method ===
The ::CLASS directive followed by a class name causes the interpreter to define a new class. After the class name, options such as METACLASS, SUBCLASS, MIXINCLASS, ABSTRACT and INHERIT can be set in order to use OOP features. The ::METHOD directive can be used to define a new class method that is associated with the last ::CLASS directive. The ::ATTRIBUTE directive is used to define an accessor method that can retrieve or assign an object variable. Using the EXPOSE instruction, an object variable can be directly exposed to a method.

d = .dog~new("Bella")           /* create and assign a dog  */
d~bark                          /* send bark message        */
say d~name                      /* output: Bella            */

::class dog                     /* class directive          */
::attribute name                /* attribute directive      */
::method init                   /* object initiation method */
  Expose name                   /* exposes name of dog      */
  use arg name                  /* assigns "Bella" to name  */
::method bark                   /* method directive         */
  Expose name
  say Name "goes woof!"         /* output: Bella goes woof! */

=== Error handling ===
The SIGNAL keyword instruction can be used to switch the trapping of certain conditions ON or OFF when they are triggered. Several condition traps can be specified, for example ERROR or FAILURE triggered by a command instruction that indicates an error or failure on return, SYNTAX raised by invalid program syntax or other error conditions, HALT is triggered by an external interruption attempt (e.g. the key combination Control-C). ANY can be used to intercept anything that a more specific condition trap does not trap. Other more specific condition traps are LOSTDIGITS (arithmetic operation has more digits than specified by the current setting), NOMETHOD (method used is not specified and object has no UNKNOWN method), NOSTRING (object does not return a required string value), NOTREADY (error during an input or output operation) or NOVALUE (use of an uninitialized variable).

The built-in CONDITION function can be used to retrieve information such as the name of the current intercepted condition and the resulting instruction process, the status of the intercepted condition, a descriptive string and additional object information.

Signal on Syntax                               /* switch on SYNTAX trap       */

Say 1 + "AString"                              /* an impossible calculation   */

Exit

SYNTAX:
  ConditionObject = Condition(Object)         /* get additional information   */
  say "Error code is" ConditionObject~Code    /* output: Error code is 41.1   */
  say ConditionObject~ErrorText         /* output: Bad arithmetic conversion. */

Similarly, the CALL keyword instruction can be used not only to invoke a routine, but also to control the trapping of certain conditions when ON or OFF is specified along with a specific condition trap (e.g. CALL ON HALT and CALL OFF HALT). These instructions do not flush the control stack, and normal execution resumes when the condition handler returns.

=== Multi-threading ===
Conceptually, ooRexx provides object-based concurrency, according to which objects have independent resources to execute methods and can communicate with each other using the messaging paradigm. Several objects can be active at the same time and exchange messages for synchronization. Concurrency can be achieved with the REPLY keyword instruction, which causes an early return from a method while its remainder continues to execute in a new thread. Alternatively, the keyword instruction GUARD can be used to mark a method as unprotected so that it can be executed together with other methods of the same class. Finally, using the START method (Object or Message class) causes the recipient to process the received message in a separate thread, thus also enabling concurrency.

=== Tracing ===
As in classic Rexx, the TRACE keyword statement and the built-in TRACE() function facilitate debugging. Both allow control over the level of detail and enable interactive debugging at runtime. When interactive debugging, the interpreter pauses after most instructions that are traced. ooRexx 5.1.0 introduces the TraceObject class, which facilitates the tracing of multi-threaded programs, for example by making it easier to determine which method is currently being guarded and blocked.

The amount of additional information provided can be specified by using either the "Thread", "Standard", "Full" or "Profiling" option. As an example, the "Full" option shows interpreted instance, thread, invocation and attribute pool IDs as well as the current guard state, the lock count, guard lock reserved indicator and waiting state.

trace off                                       /* do not trace prolog        */
.TraceObject~option = "Full"                    /* set option to "Full"       */
.TraceObject~collector = .array~new
o = .Test~new                                   /* create an instance         */
say "starting worker asynchronously ..."
o~start("do")                                   /* dispatched on a new thread */
say "about to wait for worker to end ..."
o~wait                                          /* synchronize with worker    */
say "waiting is over"

::class Test
::method init                                   /* constructor                */
  expose lock                                   /* access attribute           */
  lock = .true                                  /* set default                */

::method wait unguarded
  expose lock                                   /* access attribute           */
  guard on when lock = .false

::method do                                     /* do some work               */
  expose lock                                   /* access attribute           */
  t = random(1,999)/1000
  say "do: working for" t "secs"
  call sysSleep t
  say "do: ending work"
  lock = .false                                 /* release lock               */

::options trace results

The ooRexx debugger, which is also included in the "net-oo-rexx" bundle, is based on Trace and offers a graphical user interface (GUI) that uses the Java bridge to facilitate debugging on all platforms.

== Built-in functions and classes ==
As ooRexx aims to be compatible with classic Rexx, the traditional built-in functions are still available. Release 5.1.0 provides 82 built-in functions, including character manipulation, conversion and information functions, many of which call methods of the String class. In addition, the built-in dynamic link library RexxUtil offers 29 cross-platform, 25 Windows-specific and four Unix-specific functions for manipulating system files, directories, classes and objects.

In keeping with its object-oriented roots, ooRexx provides most of its functionality via built-in classes and methods. ooRexx 5.1.0 is delivered with a total of 58 built-in classes, which are divided into the class groups Fundamental, Stream, Collection and Utility.

=== Fundamental classes ===
Fundamental classes are the essential building blocks for all other classes. The Object class is the root of the class hierarchy, so that its methods and attributes are available for all instantiated objects of each class. The Class class (a.k.a. meta class) is used to maintain the properties of a class (like its method objects) and gets used for creating instances (a.k.a. objects, values). Therefore, an instance of this class (a.k.a. class object) is created for each ::CLASS directive. The purpose of the Method class and Routine class is to create method or routine objects. The String class provides methods for handling strings, such as logical operations, concatenation, copying, joining, splitting, reversing, arithmetic, conversion, and others. A Package class instance contains all created routines, classes, and methods and manages external dependencies referenced by ::REQUIRES directives. The Message class enables the asynchronous sending of messages, which enables the concurrent execution of methods.

=== Stream classes ===
Stream classes facilitate communication with external objects such as files, queues, serial interfaces, devices, etc. The Stream class itself is a mixin class that can be inherited and is a subclass of the InputOutputStream, InputStream, and OutputStream classes.

The Stream class provides methods for opening, reading, writing, and closing streams and flushing buffers, setting the file location, retrieving information, and other stream-related operations. While the OPEN method opens the stream, the ARRAYIN method can be used to read its content into an array object. The CLOSE method explicitly closes a stream before the stream object is reclaimed by the garbage collector.

StreamObj = .stream~new("someFile.txt")     /* create stream object */
StreamObj~open                              /* open the stream      */
FileContent = StreamObj~ArrayIn             /* read content         */
StreamObj~close                             /* close the stream     */

say FileContent                             /* outputs content      */

=== Collection classes ===
A collection is an object that contains multiple items with associated indexes that enable items to be retrieved using the AT or [] methods. There are MapCollection, SetCollection and OrderedCollection classes, all of which allow manipulation of a specific collection type.

A MapCollection is a mixin class that defines the basic set of methods implemented by all collections that map from an index to a value. The Directory, StringTable, IdentityTable, Properties, Table, Relation and Stem classes inherit these methods. A Directory or a StringTable object is a collection of unique string indexes. In an IdentityTable object, each item is associated with a single index, and there can only be one item for each index. The Properties object provides specific methods for saving and loading properties into files. Unlike a Table object, which cannot contain duplicate indexes, a Relation object is a collection in which elements can have the same index, which can be of any object type.

A Stem object is created automatically when a compound variable is used. As in classic Rexx, such a variable consists of a stem and a tail, separated by a dot (.). While the stem must begin with a letter, the tail can be any character. Using a single numeric tail creates the same effect as an array, while multiple numeric tails can be used to create a multidimensional array.

fruits.1 = "Apple"          /* assigning to stem variable */
fruits.4 = "Orange"         /* assigning to stem variable */
say fruits.4                /* output: Orange             */
say fruits.[1]              /* output: Apple              */

SetCollections are special types of MapCollections where the index and the element are the same object. While the indexes in a Set object are unique, each index in a Bag object can appear more than once.

An OrderedCollection is a mixin class that defines the basic methods for all collections that have an inherent index order, such as the List, Queue, CircularQueue and Array classes. A List object allows new items, for which a new index is created, to be added at any position in a collection. The associated index remains valid for that item regardless of other additions or removals. A Queue object allows items to be removed from the head and added to the tail or head of the queue. A CircularQueue object is a queue with a predefined size. Once the end of the circular queue is reached, new elements are inserted from the beginning to replace the previous items.

An Array is sequenced collection ordered by whole-number indexes. Like some other collection classes, the Array class provides the MAKESTRING method to encode its elements as a string object.

ArrayObj = .array~of("One", "Two", "Three") /* array with 3 items      */
say ArrayObj~at(2)                          /* output: Two             */
say ArrayObj~makeString(,"; ")              /* output: One; Two; Three */

=== Utility classes ===
Utility classes are a collection of 31 classes that provide implementations for common tasks. The MutableBuffer class enables greater efficiency in string operations such as concatenation, as no new object needs to be assigned. The File class provides methods for listing files in a directory or retrieving information about files and directories.

FileObj = .File~new("~/someFolder/") /* create file object for folder   */
FileArr = FileObj~ListFiles          /* retrieve array of files         */

do FilePath over FileArr             /* iterate over the array items    */
    say FilePath                     /* output: FilePath item           */
end

The DateTime or TimeSpan classes support the retrieval and formatting of a date, time or timestamp in various formats and enable arithmetic operations between them. Several Comparator classes facilitate sorting for built-in classes such as File, DateTime and others. The class Supplier and its subclass StreamSupplier enable the enumeration of an items collection together with an indexes collection. The Validate class provides methods that can be used to check whether given arguments are of the correct class and type, or within a numerical range. A VariableReference instance maintains a reference, while a WeakReference instance creates a reference to another object that is not pinned.

A regular expression is a pattern that can be used to match strings. To increase the readability of patterns in the code, the RegularExpression class allows the use of symbolic names encapsulated with colons (:) for common sets. For instance, matching a string containing only letters typically described as [A-Za-z] can be abbreviated using [:alpha:].

Other classes help to obtain information about the context of the currently executed code (RexxContext), the Rexx language or the executing platform (RexxInfo) and execution specifics (StackFrame) via environment symbols. The Buffer and Pointer classes are specifically designed to support writing methods and function in native code using the C/C++ APIs. Alarm and Ticker classes provide notification functions and EventSempahore and MutexSempahore classes implement synchronization mechanisms for multi-threading activities. The Monitor class enables messages to be forwarded to various target objects and the RexxQueue class provides object-like access to external Rexx data queues.

== External packages and libraries ==
Using the ::REQUIRES directive and specifying the LIBRARY option, external libraries can be integrated per program. Such libraries are usually organized around domain-specific functions.

=== Supplied with interpreter ===
The Rexx extension library offers classes for reading and writing comma-separated values (CSV) files, as well as for creating and processing JavaScript Object Notation (JSON) data. A library called "hostemenu" is also included, which partially emulates a TSO/CMS environment. The RxSock native library enables to incorporate TCP/IP protocols, while the RxFtp native library specifically provides access to the file transfer protocol (FTP). The RxMath native library offers advanced mathematical functions such as square root calculation, exponential function, logarithm, sine, cosine, tangent, arc sine and power calculation.

Say rxcalcsin(1)                /* output: 0.0174524064     */

::requires 'rxmath' LIBRARY     /* load a native library    */

For Windows, ooRexx includes the ooDialog framework allowing to produce Windows dialogs and therefore graphical user interfaces. The interpreter is delivered with several example programs and function packages that demonstrate the use of this framework. For POSIX-compatible operating systems, the orxnCurses class library enables the writing of text-based user interfaces using the ncurses programming library. The RxUnixSys library provides functions on most Unix systems for interacting with processes and threads, users and user groups, files and file systems and other. Many of these external packages and libraries are also compatible with other Rexx implementations.

=== Not supplied with interpreter ===
There are also packages that need to be downloaded and added manually. As part of the Net-oo-rexx bundle, the Regex package enables handling regular expressions, while Log4rexx provides a logging framework and Oorexxshell an interactive ooRexx shell. ooRexxUnit is a test framework inspired by JUnit that enables the execution of ooRexx test cases that help to verify whether an application's specifications are met.

The Rexx Parser package provides an abstract syntax tree parser for Rexx and ooRexx, which assigns a category to all script elements, while the Rexx Highlighter package expands the parser and enables highlighting to be output as HTML, ANSI colors, LuaTex and LaTeX. The Rexx XML parser enables the parsing of XML files into an in-memory model and access to this model via a DOM-like API. There is also an XML DOM parser without a validation function, which includes a DOM builder and DOM access methods.

Although RexxGTK does not cover the entire GTK toolkit, it wraps the GTK library in a set of ooRexx classes and functions to provide platform-independent GUI functionality. A provisional package with tested support for Linux is available for newer versions of GTK. Rexx/Tk provides an interface to the Tk library that allows to create portable, cross-platform GUI applications.

RexxHTTP was first released in 2006 and runs as a CGI program that can be used to create web applications. For every incoming request, it converts the raw CGI environment into a small set of objects and then executes a ooRexx program on them. Output is produced with ordinary Say or CharOut instructions. RexxHTTP requires ooRexx 5.2.0 or later and Apache 2.4. The Mod_Rexx package takes a different approach to web development and offers a module for Apache 2.4 that gives an interface to ooRexx under Windows, AIX and Linux and enables all phases of a request to be processed.

Both a native wrapper library and a C++ extension are available for interacting with Gnuplot; the latter allows scripts to seamlessly pass commands to Gnuplot using the address gnuplot syntax.

Alchemy is a collection of ooRexx libraries and sample applications—which are still under development—that cover the areas of networking and messaging, distributed storage, identity and security, LLM integration, document formats, and scientific computing.

== Bridges ==
While ooRexx compared to Object REXX no longer contains classes for SOM and WPS support, it offers application programming interfaces (APIs) for interacting with code written in C or C++.

=== C/C++ APIs ===
As classic Rexx, ooRexx includes APIs for extending Rexx with applications written in C and vice versa. This enables the creation of handlers for subcommands used in Rexx programs that run as application macros, external functions that allow a direct extension of the ooRexx function set and system functions that allow the behavior of the interpreter to be customized.

With ooRexx 4.0.0 APIs have been introduced that allow C++ applications to extend ooRexx and vice versa. This includes handlers for methods and functions written in C++ that extend ooRexx, both packaged as external libraries. These are dynamic link libraries on Windows or as shared libraries on Unix-based systems. An external library can be loaded with the ::REQUIRES directive or by using the EXTERNAL keyword instruction as part of a ::ROUTINE, ::METHOD, or ::ATTRIBUTE directive.

=== Java ===
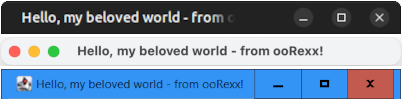
Multi-platform GUIs via BSF4ooRexx

Using the C++ APIs, BSF4ooRexx was developed as a bidirectional Java bridge based on the Bean Scripting Framework. This bridge enables ooRexx to communicate with Java objects and Java to interact with Rexx applications. The bridge is realized by requiring the ooRexx package BSF.CLS, which defines public routines, classes and the environment symbol .BSF4REXX. Examples are provided for the use of Java classes in connection with AWT, Swing, JavaFX, JDBC, Java 2D and some others.

/* create Java object */
frame=.bsf~new("javax.swing.JFrame", "Hello, my beloved world - from ooRexx!")

frame~setSize(410,20)                           /* set width and height	      */
frame~visible=.true                             /* make JFrame visible     	  */
call SysSleep 10                                /* sleep for ten seconds      */

::requires "BSF.CLS"                            /* get Java support           */

Based on BSF4ooRexx, interaction with Universal Network Objects (UNO), as used in OpenOffice and LibreOffice, is supported via the UNO.CLS package. The CLR.CLS package together with Jini4Net enables the use of the .NET framework. Communication with processes via the D-Bus middleware under Linux is possible using the DBUS.CLS package. The JDOR.CLS package provides a command handler that leverages the Java2D classes (based on AWT) for graphics rendering. Based on the JDOR command handler, the experimental JDORFX.CLS package enables the rendering of 3D graphics using JavaFX 3D classes.

=== .NET ===
Rexx.Net is a bidirectional bridge between ooRexx and .NET that enables Rexx programs and code running on the Common Language Runtime (C#, F#, Visual Basic, PowerShell) to directly use each other's platform objects. A Rexx program can create .NET objects, call their methods, read and set their properties, and handle their events. .NET objects appear in Rexx as ordinary Rexx objects through the .net entry point and the .NetObject class. Any .NET application can run Rexx code and use Rexx objects as .NET objects through the RexxInterpreter and RexxObject classes.

say .net~System~Math~Max(3, 7)                 
list = .net~type("System.Collections.Generic.List<int>")~new
list~Add(3); list~Add(1); list~Sort
say list[0] list~Count                         

::requires "net.cls"

=== Lua ===
ooRexx/Lua is a bidirectional bridge between ooRexx and Lua that lets Rexx programs and Lua code (including LuaTeX) use each other’s objects directly. A Rexx program can run Lua code, call Lua functions, and use Lua tables and objects. These appear in Rexx as ordinary Rexx objects through the .lua entry point and the .LuaObject class, and .LuaState creates additional independent Lua instances.

string = .lua~global("string")
say string~upper("hello")            
say string~rep("ab", 3, "-")  

::requires "lua.cls"

=== Python ===
Two independent bridges connect ooRexx with Python. At the 36th Rexx Symposium, a unidirectional bridge to Python was introduced that allows ooRexx programs to use Python classes, objects, and functions via the .PyRexx class. Later, a bidirectional bridge was introduced that makes it possible to use Python modules such as NumPy as ordinary Rexx objects via the .py entry point and the .PyObject class in Rexx. Any Python program can run Rexx code and use Rexx objects as Python objects through the oorexx.Interpreter and oorexx.RexxObject classes.

np = .py~import("numpy")
m  = np~array(((1, 2), (3, 4)))
say m~sum m~shape                     
say .py~round(np~linalg~det(m), 2)

::requires "python.cls"

=== SQL ===
The ooSQLite class provides an interface to SQLite, an in-process library that implements a self-contained, serverless, zero-configuration, transactional SQL database engine. It allows interaction with several variants of SQL databases without having to change the script, but multi-threading is not supported.

The external Rexx/SQL package enables access to SQL databases of different vendors via Open Database Connectivity (ODBC). With the goal of providing more functionality than a subset of ODBC and being thread-safe, the Rexx MySQL library provides a wrapper in C to add MySQL support.

=== Windows automation ===
The Windows extension includes the Windows Script Host (WSH) Scripting Engine that can be used to perform general automation tasks. It also includes Object Linking and Embedding/ActiveX (OLE) support allowing to interact with Windows programs via the OLEObject. OLE Automation is an inter-process communication mechanism developed by Microsoft that is based on a subset of the Component Object Model (COM). This mechanism enables, among other things, the invocation of program functions, the querying and setting of attributes and the interception of component events. The ooRexx interpreter comes with examples that demonstrate OLE interaction with Access, Word, Excel, OpenOffice/LibreOffice, ActiveDirectory, WMI and other programs. Furthermore, a utility program for searching available OLE objects is included.

exc = .OLEObject~new("Excel.Application")     /* create object for Excel */
exc~visible = .true                           /* make Excel visible      */
Worksheet = exc~Workbooks~Add~Worksheets[1]   /* add worksheet           */
Worksheet~cells(1,1)~Value = "First Cell"     /* insert string into cell */

In addition to OLE support, the Windows extension enables interaction with the Windows program manager, the system event log, the clipboard and the registry as well as to query, edit and interact with windows, menus or sub-menus.

In addition to the bridges already mentioned, the Alchemy framework includes bidirectional bridges between ooRexx and Ruby, Prolog, and Pharo Smalltalk, as well as a Python bridge as a proof of concept.

== See also ==
- Comparison of programming languages
- Timeline of programming languages
