= NetRexx =

- Paradigm: multiparadigm: object-oriented, procedural, structured
- Designed by: Mike Cowlishaw
- First appeared: 1996; 30 years ago
- Stable release: 5.01 / 2 May 2025; 17 months ago
- Typing discipline: Static, strong, safe, partly dynamic, everything is a string (for the Rexx data type, which handles strings and numbers)
- OS: Cross-platform: Linux, Microsoft Windows, macOS, z/OS, z/VM, Android
- License: ICU License
- Filename extensions: .nrx
- Website: www.netrexx.org

Major implementations
- RexxLA NetRexx

Influenced by
- PL/I, REXX, ooREXX, Java

NetRexx is an open source, originally IBM's, variant of the REXX programming language to run on the Java virtual machine. It supports a classic REXX syntax, with no reserved keywords, along with considerable additions to support object-oriented programming in a manner compatible with Java's object model, yet can be used as both a compiled and an interpreted language, with an option of using only data types native to the JVM or the NetRexx runtime package. The latter offers the standard Rexx data type that combines string processing with unlimited precision decimal arithmetic.

Integration with the JVM platform is tight, and all existing Java class libraries can be used unchanged and without special setup; at the same time, a Java programmer can opt to just use the Rexx class from the runtime package for improved string handling in Java syntax source programs.

NetRexx is free to download from the Rexx Language Association. IBM announced the transfer of NetRexx 3.00 source code to the Rexx Language Association (RexxLA) on June 8, 2011.

== History ==
In 1995 Mike Cowlishaw ported Java to OS/2 and soon after started with an experiment to run REXX on the JVM. With REXX generally considered the first of the general purpose scripting languages, NetRexx is the first alternative language for the JVM. The 0.50 release, from April 1996, contained the NetRexx runtime classes and a translator written in REXX but tokenized and turned into an OS/2 executable. The 1.00 release came available in January 1997 and contained a translator bootstrapped to NetRexx.

Release 2.00 became available in August 2000 and was a major upgrade, in which interpreted execution was added.

Mike Cowlishaw left IBM in March 2010, and the future of IBM NetRexx as open source was unknown for a while. IBM finally announced the transfer of NetRexx source code to the Rexx Language Association (RexxLA) on June 8, 2011, 14 years after the v1.0 release.

IBM released the NetRexx source code to RexxLA under the ICU license. RexxLA shortly after released this as NetRexx 3.00 and has followed up with regular releases, with 4.01 (2021-03-20) adding Java Platform Module System support to support Java versions 9 and higher. As of 2018 the ICU license has not been approved by OSI; it appears to be a variant of the Expat License.

== Syntax ==
NetRexx is a blend of the REXX syntax and the Java object-oriented programming paradigm. It is used for classes, methods and properties and has some characteristics of REXX including a relatively limited number of reserved keywords and decimal arithmetic. NetRexx programs can directly access Java classes and libraries.

The NetRexx translator can generate code for the Java Virtual Machine, which can execute NetRexx classes and call for Java classes to be executed in the Java environment.
