= GPHPedit =

IDE for web development in PHP

gPHPEdit
- Developers: Andy Jeffries, Anoop John
- Preview release: 0.9.91 / July 5, 2006; 20 years ago
- Available in: English
- Type: Text editor
- License: Since 0.9.96: GPL-3.0-or-later; Until 0.9.91: GPL-2.0-or-later
- Website: www.gphpedit.org
- Repository: github.com/anoopjohn/gphpedit

gPHPedit is a discontinued UTF-8-compatible IDE for web development in PHP using the GNOME desktop environment. gPHPedit is built using Scintilla. It was originally written by Andy Jeffries, and was maintained by Anoop John. It is similar to gedit with the difference that it is designed for PHP and HTML text editing. The last version is 0.9.91, released on July 5, 2006. It is free software licensed under the terms of the GNU General Public License (GPL).

== Features ==
=== Syntax highlighting ===
- Highlights PHP/HTML gPHPEdit will recognise PHP and HTML files and colour-highlight the file during editing. It recognises all PHP functions up to and including PHP 4.3.0.
- Highlights CSS gPHPEdit will recognise CSS files and colour-highlight the file during editing. It highlights valid classes and descriptors.
- Highlights SQL Currently in beta test phase, gPHPEdit will recognise SQL files and colour highlight the file during editing. This functionality is in its early stages of development and may have bugs. The files will not be affected, but may not appear correctly highlighted.

=== Coding assistance ===
- Dropdown function lists Start typing the first few characters of a PHP function name and gPHPEdit will drop down a list of all the PHP functions that match. It recognises all PHP functions up to and including PHP 4.3.0.
- Function parameter popups After typing the name of a PHP function and hitting the open parenthesis "(" button, a list of the required/desired parameters will appear to help you remember the order of them.
- Class/function browser If the opened file is in the same location as other PHP files, gPHPEdit will automatically examine them and display a list of all the functions and classes in those files in a tree view on the left hand side of the editor. This view can be hidden/shown with a keypress to use the full width of the screen.

=== Syntax checking/navigating code ===
- Lint checking If the command line binary is installed for PHP, gPHPEdit can use it to do a lint check on the code being edited. If the command line binary finds a problem it will underline the appropriate line with a wavy red line (ala Microsoft Word spell check).
- Incremental search Either click in the box or hit Ctrl+I to start typing some text to match. As type is entered the editor will find text that matches. If there are multiple matches, hit Enter each time to cycle through them. When finished searching, hit Escape to send the focus to the editor to make the changes at the last found position.
- Goto line If the line number to edit is known (for example from an in-browser error message), click in the box or hit Ctrl+G to type a line number. When Enter is pressed, gPHPEdit will go directly to that line ready for editing.

=== Integrated help ===
- Context sensitive help Highlighting a PHP function and hitting F1 will display the function's help page in gPHPEdit (provided that you have the PHP documentation installed in the correct place and that you have the gtkhtml2 component installed). After viewing one of the context sensitive pages, the links within the page are active. allowing navigation between related help pages.
- Fast startup Because the help system is an integral part of gPHPEdit, there is no startup time when hitting F1 – the page loads almost immediately after the button is pressed.

== Porting/testing ==
Version 0.9.91 is now in Debian Stable thanks to Lior Kaplan.

gPHPedit is available as a stable Gentoo binary.

It has also been ported to FreeBSD although not officially supported by gPHPedit.org
