= Visual editor =

Type of text editor

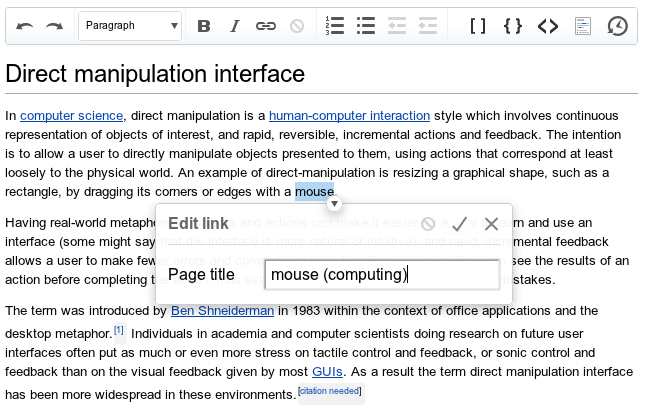
VisualEditor on Wikipedia, an example of a visual editor.

A visual editor is computer software for editing text files using a textual or graphical user interface that normally renders the content (text) in accordance with embedded markup code, e.g., HTML, Wikitext, rather than displaying the raw text. Edits made to the page appear in real time, correctly formatted, and are often referred to as WYSIWYG (What You See Is What You Get). It is common for the software to permit switching to source-code editor mode so that the original source code can be viewed or modified.

By definition, all visual editors require a refreshable display device. However, some editors (Note: even GUI editors) using such devices, e.g., BRIEF, ISPF, gVim, KEDIT, THE, XEDIT, are not visual editors.

== See also ==
- WYSIWYG
