= EXEC 2 =

EXEC 2 is an interpreted, command procedure control, computer scripting language used by the EXEC 2 Processor originally supplied with the CMS component of the IBM Virtual Machine/System Product (VM/SP) operating system.

== Relation to EXEC ==
EXEC 2 is mostly compatible with CMS EXEC but EXEC 2 scripts must begin with an &TRACE statement. Some EXEC statements and predefined variables do not exist in EXEC 2, although in some cases there are analogs. There are some minor differences in some statements and predefined functions.

EXEC 2 has the following enhancements:

- There is no 8-byte restriction on token length.
- Statements can be up to 255 characters long.
- EXEC 2 can issue commands to subcommand environments as well as CMS and CP.
- EXEC 2 has additional built-in functions.
- EXEC 2 has user-defined functions.
- EXEC 2 commands may include subroutines and functions.
- EXEC 2 has extra debugging facilities.
- CMS programs can manipulate EXEC 2 variables.

Some statements of EXEC are not supported in EXEC 2, including:

- &BEGSTACK ALL
- &CONTROL
- &EMSG
- &END
- &GOTO TOP
- &HEX
- &PUNCH
- &SPACE
- &TIME

Some predefined variables of EXEC are not defined in EXEC2:

- &*
- &$
- &DISKX
- &DISK*
- &DISK?
- &DOS
- &EXEC
- &GLOBAL
- &GLOBALn
- &READFLAG
- &TYPEFLAG

== XEDIT Macros ==
XEDIT Macros are files with filetype XEDIT, whose contents are written using the syntax of CMS EXEC, EXEC 2 or REXX. Like regular EXEC 2 "EXEC" command files, they begin with a "&TRACE" statement, to distinguish them from CMS EXEC files.

== History ==
Written in the 1970s and formally introduced for CMS with VM/SP Release 1, EXEC 2 was preceded by CMS EXEC and superseded by REXX.

All three command interpreters—CMS EXEC, EXEC 2 and REXX — continue to be supported by z/VM.
