= Study Archive =

The Study Archive file format is a data compression and archive format, based directly on the ZIP file format. Study archives are intended for the development and use of sets of interactive flashcards, which may contain not only text but also images and audio files, in various applications.

The format was created in 2011 by The Mental Faculty, made for use with its Mental Case series of flashcard applications for the Mac OS X and iOS platforms, but intended to be a cross-platform format compatible with other applications, to allow for ease of import/export and portability.

Study archives are collections of data (in CSV and/or TSV files), images, and audio files, arranged in an organized hierarchical directory structure and packaged in a compressed ZIP archive for use with flashcard applications. As ZIP archives, the file format extension is simply .zip

The standard hierarchal structure for study archives is illustrated in the following example:

Archive 
    Ungrouped
        Data.csv
    Groups 
        Case Collection 1
            Case 1
                Data.csv
            Case 2
                Data.tsv
            Case Collection 2
                Case 3
                    Data.csv
                    Image 1.jpg
                    Audio 1.wav
        Case 4
            Data.tsv

The study archive documentation also defines a studyarch URL protocol for study archives on the Internet to be directly opened in a supporting application. The protocol simply replaces http:// with studyarch:// in a standard direct link to a given study archive .zip file. Currently the Mental Case applications support this protocol.
