= Folding region =

Folding region may refer to,

- Code folding
- A region of protein folding
- A fold belt in geology
