= Cowlishaw =

Cowlishaw is a surname. Notable people with the surname include:

- Gillian Cowlishaw (born 1934), New Zealand-born anthropologist
- James Cowlishaw (1834–1929), Australia architect, businessman and politician
- Mary Lou Cowlishaw (1932–2010), American politician
- Mike Cowlishaw, computer scientist
- Tim Cowlishaw (born 1955), American sportswriter
- William Harrison Cowlishaw (1869–1957), British architect

== See also ==
- Cole slaw (disambiguation)
