= Accordion (GUI) =

Expandable GUI element containing vertically stacked list of items

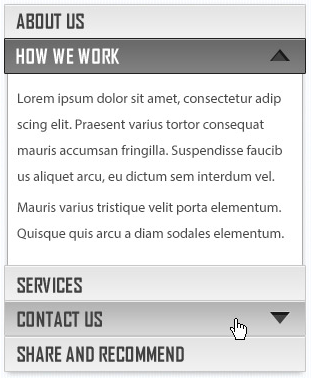
Accordion widget

The accordion is a graphical control element comprising a vertically stacked list of items, such as labels or thumbnails. Each item can be "expanded" or "collapsed" to reveal the content associated with that item. There can be zero expanded items, exactly one, or more than one item expanded at a time, depending on the configuration.

The term stems from the musical accordion in which sections of the bellows can be expanded by pulling outward.

A common example of an accordion is the Show/Hide operation of a box region, but extended to have multiple sections in a list.

An accordion is similar in purpose to a tabbed interface, a list of items where exactly one item is expanded into a panel (i.e. list items are shortcuts to access separate panels).

== User definition ==
Several windows are stacked on each other. All of them are "shaded", so only their captions are visible. If one of them is clicked, to make it active, it is "unshaded" or "maximized". Other windows in accordion are displaced around top or bottom edge.

== Examples ==
A common example using a GUI accordion is the Show/Hide operation of a box region, but extended to have multiple sections in a list.

The list view of Google Reader also features this.

In an early example, Apple's download page used roll-over accordions in 2008. In this example, captured in the Wayback Machine in the Internet Archive, the left column of the page includes three categories that expand on roll-over: "All Downloads", "Top Apple Downloads", and "Top Downloads".

== See also ==
- Code folding, a similar technique applied to text
