= Indent (Unix) =

indent
- Original author: David Willcox
- Developers: David Ingamells, Carlo Wood, Joseph Arceneaux, Jim Kingdon, John Bridges
- Initial release: November 1976; 49 years ago
- Stable release: 2.2.13 / 20 March 2023; 3 years ago
- Written in: C
- Operating system: Cross-platform
- Type: source-code-reformat tool
- License: GNU: GPL-3.0-or-later
- Website: GNU: gnu.org/software/indent/
- Repository: git.savannah.gnu.org/cgit/indent.git

indent is a Unix utility that reformats C and C++ code in a user-defined indentation style and coding style. Support for C++ code is minimal.

The original version of indent was written by David Willcox at the University of Illinois in November 1976. It was incorporated into 4.1BSD in October 1982. GNU indent was first written by Jim Kingdon in 1989. The command is available as a separate package for Microsoft Windows as part of the UnxUtils collection of native Win32 ports of common GNU Unix-like utilities.

== Examples of usage ==
The following command

$ indent -st -bap -bli0 -i4 -l79 -ncs -npcs -npsl -fca -lc79 -fc1 -ts4 some_file.c

indents some_file.c in a style resembling BSD/Allman style and writes the result to the standard output.

== GNU indent ==
GNU indent is the GNU Project's version of indent. A different indentation style, the GNU style, is used by default.
