= N-up =

Page layout strategy

In printing, 2-up, 3-up, or more generally N-up, is a page layout strategy in which multiple pre-rendered pages are composited onto a single page; achieved by reduction in size, possible rotations, and subsequent arrangement in a grid pattern. The primary purpose of N-up printing is to reduce the number of pages that a printed work would otherwise require without having to re-edit, index, or flow the layout of the individual pages of an existing work.

N-up printing should not be confused with multiple column layout or the pre-press imposition process.

The general availability of N-up printing in computerized output was stimulated with the introduction of page layout languages such as PostScript, and later PDF, which made such page compositions very easy; as exemplified by the GNU Enscript program as early as 1995.

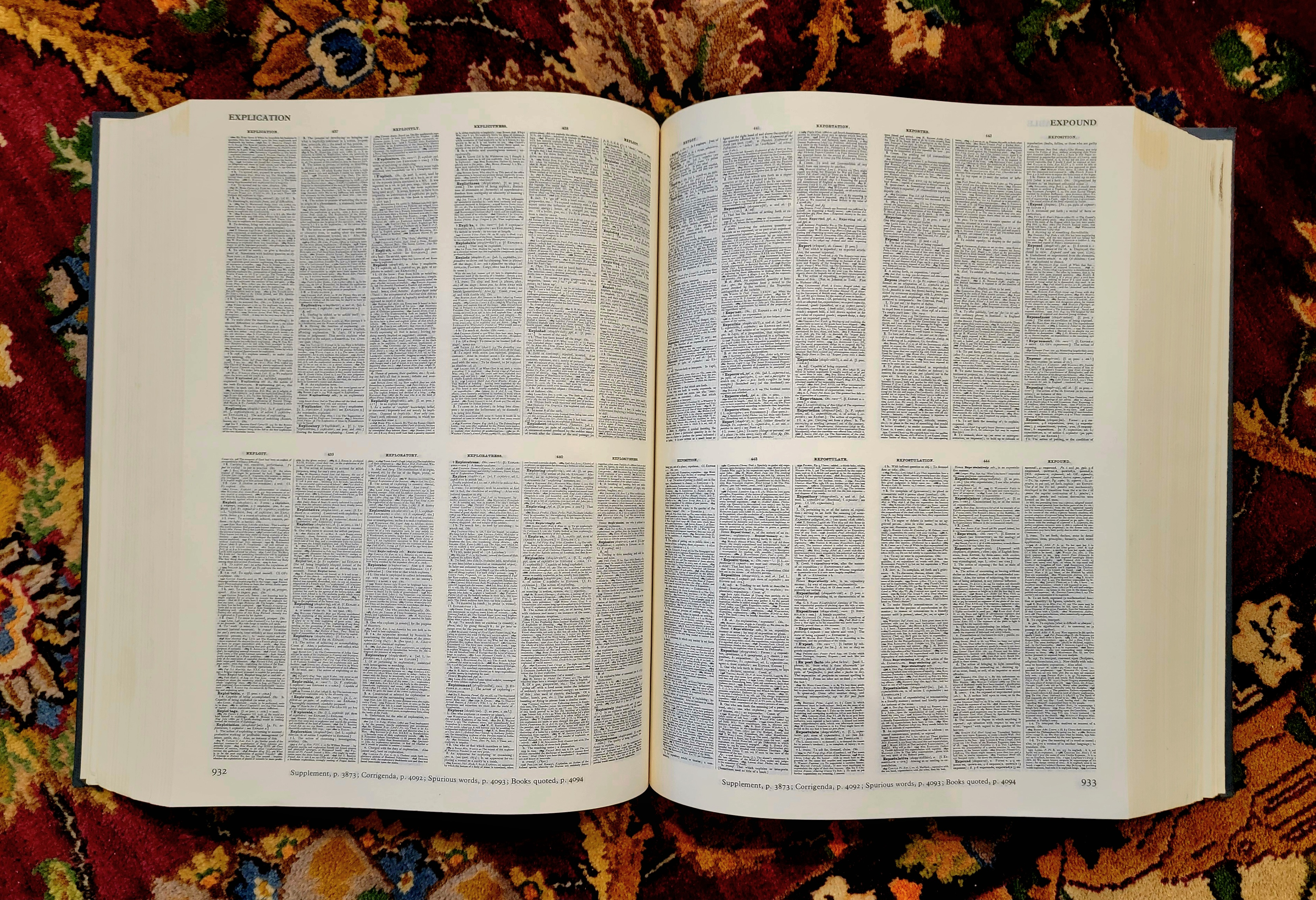
Compact Oxford English Dictionary showing its 1970s 4-up layout

The 2nd edition of the Compact OED showing its 9-up layout

The Compact Oxford English Dictionary is notable for using N-up printing as a means to physically compress the large multi-volume dictionary into a much smaller and thus more accessible work. The first Compact OED edition of 1971 used a 4-up layout (4 original pages per resulting page) and included a rectangular Bausch & Lomb magnifying glass; while the second edition of 1991 used a 9-up format, giving a total of 18 original pages being visible when the book is opened so both the recto and verso pages are displayed. The 9-up format, especially considering each original page used a 3-column layout, required such a reduction in font size that it necessitated the use of a magnifying lens to be legible.

== See also ==
- Duplex printing
- Panelization
