= Cole slaw (disambiguation) =

Cole slaw is a salad made of raw cabbage.

Cole slaw may also refer to:

- Cole Slaw, an album by Lou Donaldson
- "Cole Slaw", also called "Sorghum Switch", a 1949 song by Jesse Stone

== See also ==
- Cowlishaw (disambiguation)
