= Mary Lou Cowlishaw =

American journalist and politician

Mary Lou (née Miller) Cowlishaw (February 20, 1932 – June 23, 2010) was an American journalist and politician.

Born in Rockford, Illinois, Cowlishaw received her bachelor's degree in journalism from University of Illinois at Urbana–Champaign and did graduate work at Northwestern University. She then worked on the editorial board of the Naperville Sun newspaper. Cowlishaw served on the Naperville, Illinois Board of Education from 1972 to 1983 and was a Republican. Then Cowlishaw served in the Illinois House of Representatives from 1983 until 2002. She was an adjunct professor at North Central College. She also wrote a book about the history of the Naperville Municipal Band: This Band's Has Been Here Quite a Spell. Cowlishaw died in Naperville, Illinois where she had lived since 1958.
