= Enscript =

GNU Enscript
- Stable release: 1.6.6 / 25 September 2012; 13 years ago
- Website: gnu.org/software/enscript/
- Repository: git.savannah.gnu.org/cgit/enscript.git

enscript is the name of a computer program originally written by Adobe in the late 1980s that converts text files to PostScript for printing. It has been re-implemented by many parties, including GNU and SPARC.

The GNU version is released under GNU GPL version 3. It has many additional functionalities, such as syntax highlighting, support for other page sizes, and the ability to use RTF or HTML formats instead. As of June 2020, it seems to be the only enscript still being maintained.

The reason enscript became popular seems to be its support for 2-up printing compared to the old pr. This is no longer a distinct functionality in any way.
