= Tab stop =

Location at which typewriter carriage stops

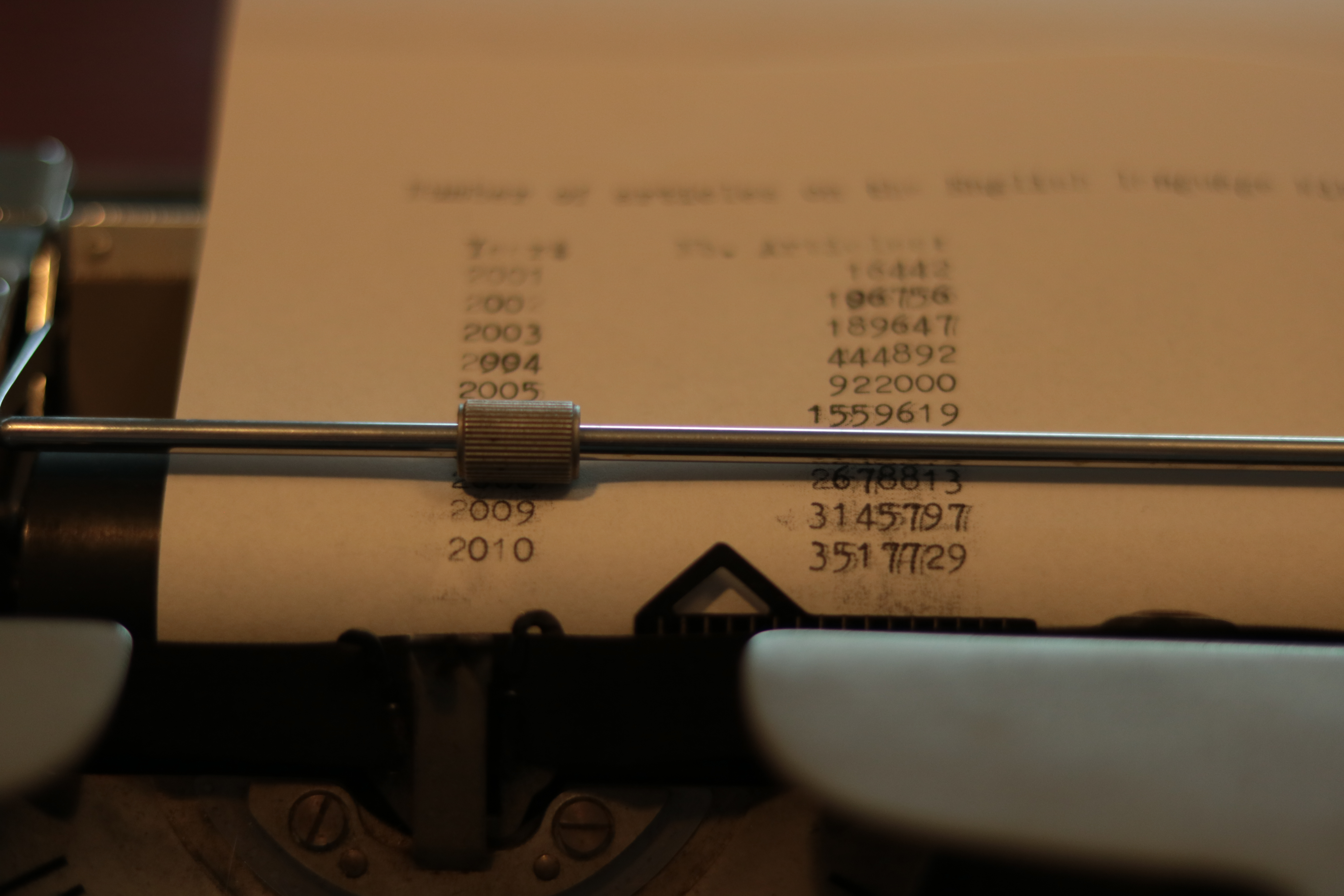
A document made up on a typewriter, using tab stops

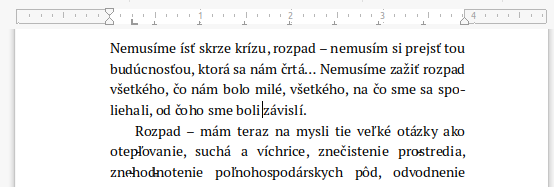
A ruler depicting tab stops at the top of a word processor document

A tab stop or tabulator position on a typewriter is a location where the carriage movement is halted by an adjustable end stop. Tab stops are set manually, and pressing the tab key causes the carriage to go to the next tab stop. In text editors on a computer, the same concept is implemented simplistically with automatic, fixed tab stops.

Modern word processors generalize this concept by offering tab stops that have an alignment attribute and cause the text to be automatically aligned at left, at right or center of the tab stop itself. Such tab stops are paragraph-specific properties and can be moved to a different location in any moment, or even removed.

Sometimes, placeholders in code snippets are also called "tab stops" because the user can cycle through them by pressing the tab key.

== Tab stops on a typewriter ==
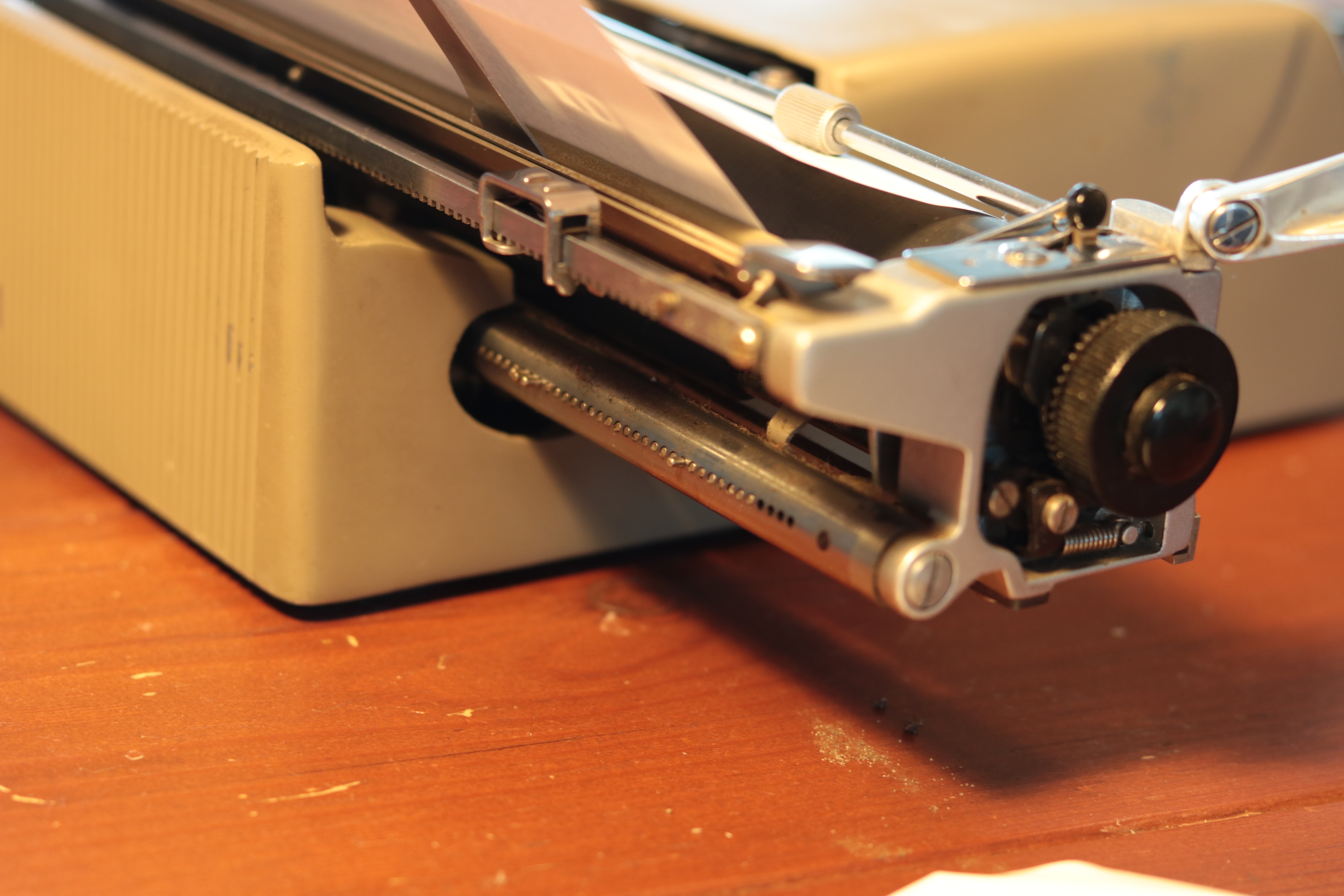
Tab stops on an Olivetti Lettera 22 typewriter. The round metal bar on the underside of the carriage has a row of needles, of which some are extended. These needles form the tab stops, and can be set or unset by using the tab stop set lever (on the left of the keyboard). The tab key lets the carriage move to the left until it hits a set tab stop.

Olivetti Lettera 22 - typing a document using tab stops

Many modern typewriters have tab stops. These can be either fixed, usually at 8 or 10 character intervals, or user-settable. There were many ways to set the tab stops, from very complicated to very simple and interactive.

The Olivetti Lettera 22 has a lever at left of the keyboard, that can be used to set (pull lever towards you) or unset (push lever away) a tab stop. This pushes a pin out (or in) on a metal bar at the underside of the carriage, that engages with the tab stop pawl.

== Types of tab stops ==
A tab stop is a horizontal position which is set for placing and aligning text on a page. There are at least five kinds of tab stops in general usage in word processing or in Microsoft Word.

Left
text extends to the right from the tab stop.
Center
text is centered at the tab stop.
Right
text extends to the left from the tab stop until the tab's space is filled, and then the text extends to the right.
Decimal
text before the decimal point extends to the left, and text after the decimal point extends to the right.
Bar
a vertical line at the specified position on each line in a document.

== Dynamic tab stops ==
In contrast to fixed positioning, tab stops can be adjusted dynamically, based on the length of adjacent tab-delimited line segments, by alignment to a specific character or string in each line, etc. Adobe InDesign supports a non-printing "indent to here" character.

Brief video demonstrating the behavior of elastic tabstops in a text editor.

In 2006, Nick Gravgaard published an algorithm for automatic dynamic tab stops called "Elastic tabstops". This can be useful for viewing/editing source code and is naturally essential for tabular data. Various text editors and IDEs have implemented the elastic tabstops algorithm either directly or by extension.

=== Software which supports elastic tabstops ===
- Visual Studio
- Atom
- Textadept
- Code Browser
- JEdit
- Notepad++
- Go tabwriter package
- Rust tabwriter crate
- Emacs
- list of current implementations on Nick Gravgaard's website

== See also ==
- Typographic alignment for an application
- Table (information) for another application
