= Imp (disambiguation) =

An imp is a mythological being similar to a demon or fairy.

Imp or IMP may also refer to:

== Arts and entertainment ==
=== Music ===
- IMP (band) a Japanese boy band

=== Fictional characters ===
- Imp (She-Ra), a character in She-Ra: Princess of Power
- Imp, a character in Artemis Fowl: The Lost Colony
- Imp, a character in the Clan Destine series of Marvel Comics
- Imp, nickname of Tyrion Lannister, a character from A Song of Ice and Fire series
- Imp, or Impie, a character from the Little Nemo comic strip

=== Games ===
- International Match Points, in contract bridge
- Imp, a small Zombie that can appear randomly in Plants vs. Zombies
- Imp (Dungeons & Dragons), a type of fictional lower level devil in the Dungeons & Dragons role-playing game
- Imp (Shattered Galaxy), an infantry Unit in the MMORPG Shattered Galaxy
- Imp, fire and ice enemies in the video game Hexen II
- Imp, enemy in the video game Doom series
- Imp, popular pet used by Warlocks in World of Warcraft
- Imp, monster enemy in Geist
- Imp, worker units in RTS Dungeon Keeper and its sequel
- Imp, short for members of the Empire ("Imperials") from Star Wars Galaxies and various Star Wars games
- Midna, a main character from The Legend of Zelda: Twilight Princess, who resembles an imp for most of the game
- Implementer (video games), a term for developers in the Zork series and in DikuMUDs
- International Match Point, one form of scoring in duplicate bridge
- Imps, the cursor in the UGC game Dreams_(video_game)

== Science and technology ==
- Research Institute of Molecular Pathology, a molecular biology research institute in Vienna
- Imager for Mars Pathfinder, a camera on board the Mars Pathfinder lander
- imipenem/cilastatin, an antibiotic combination
- Interplanetary Monitoring Platform, a series of NASA space science missions within the Explorer program, launched between 1966 and 1973
- Investigational medicinal product, medication used in a clinical trial
- Inosine monophosphate, a nucleotide
- Integral membrane protein, a class of proteins attached to cell membranes
- blaIMP (IMP), a type of metallo-beta-lactamase conferring resistance against carbapenem antibiotics
- N-Isopropyl-(^{123}I)-p-iodoamphetamine, or iofetamine (^{123}I), a diagnostic radiopharmaceutical
- Irregular mare patch, a smooth area in the lunar maria.
- Imp, a baby Tasmanian devil

=== Computing ===
- Interface Message Processor, a packet-switching node for connecting computers to ARPANET (modern term: router)
- IMP programming language, a systems programming language for the CDC 6600
- Edinburgh IMP, a systems programming language used in the EMAS operating system
- Internet Messaging Program, a webmail client
- Intercept Modernisation Programme, a proposal by the UK government to centralise the storage electronic communications traffic data
- Integrated Middleware Platform, for external system aiming to service logic communication
- Information Module Profile, a subset of the Mobile Information Device Profile
- Interactive Media Player (iMP), the former name of the BBC iPlayer

== Organizations ==
- Imparja Television (callsign IMP), an Australian television broadcaster
- IMP Group International, a Canadian investment corporation, operator of Cascade Aerospace
- Independent Moving Pictures, an early movie studio absorbed by Universal in 1912
- Industrial Marketing and Purchasing Group, a European research initiative in the field of Industrial marketing
- International Music Publications, a British sheet music publisher
- IMP Society, a secret society at the University of Virginia
- Incentive Mentoring Program, a non-profit organization aiming to transform the lives of Baltimore teenagers failing high school
- Mihajlo Pupin Institute (Serbian: Институт Михајло Пупин, romanized: Institut Mihajlo Pupin), an electronics institute based in Belgrade, Serbia
- Institute of Modern Politics, a Bulgarian think-tank
- Israeli Military Police or Investigating Military Police (Criminal Investigations Division/CID)
- Research Institute of Molecular Pathology, a basic biomedical research center at the Campus Vienna Biocenter

== Transportation ==
- Hillman Imp, a British car of the 1960s-1970s
- Subaru Impreza, a Japanese car, nicknamed Imp
- Thiokol 1404 IMP, a 1970s snowcat made by Thiokol

== Other uses ==
- Interactive Mathematics Program, a Key Curriculum Press Interactive Math curriculum
- Isle of Man pound, or Manx pound
- Imp (horse), American Champion Thoroughbred racehorse
- "IMP", Latin abbreviation used on British coins up to 1947, such as the British two shilling coin
- Individual Meal Pack, a ration used by the Canadian Armed Forces
- Integrated master plan, a part of project planning
- Brown University International Mentoring Program, a student-based program at Brown University
- Ittihad-ul-Mujahideen Pakistan, a Pakistani alliance of Islamist militant groups
- Imping, the practice of fixing a broken feather of a bird
- “I.M.P” (Immediate Murder Professionals), a fictional organisation of demonic assassins from the Helluva Boss series

== See also ==
- IMPS (disambiguation)
- The Imp (disambiguation)
