= Atlas Autocode =

1960s computer programming language

- Paradigms: Procedural, imperative, structured
- Family: ALGOL
- Designed by: Tony Brooker, Derrick Morris
- Developer: University of Manchester
- First appeared: 1963; 63 years ago
- Typing discipline: Static, strong
- Scope: Lexical
- Implementation language: ALGOL 60
- Platform: Atlas; English Electric KDF9
- OS: Supervisor

Major implementations
- Edinburgh IMP

Influenced by
- ALGOL 60

Atlas Autocode (AA) is a programming language developed around 1963 at the University of Manchester. A variant of the language ALGOL, it was developed by Tony Brooker and Derrick Morris for the Atlas computer. The initial AA and AB compilers were written by Jeff Rohl and Tony Brooker using the Brooker–Morris compiler-compiler, with a later hand-coded non-CC implementation (ABC) by Jeff Rohl.

The word Autocode was basically an early term for programming language. Different autocodes could vary greatly.

== Features ==
AA was a block structured language that featured explicitly typed variables, subroutines, and functions. It omitted some ALGOL features such as passing parameters by name, which in ALGOL 60 means passing the memory address of a short subroutine (a thunk) to recalculate a parameter each time it is mentioned.

The AA compiler could generate range-checking for array accesses, and allowed an array to have dimensions that were determined at runtime, i.e., an array could be declared as integer array Thing (i:j), where i and j were calculated values.

AA high-level routines could include machine code, either to make an inner loop more efficient or to effect some operation which otherwise cannot be done easily.

AA included a complex data type to represent complex numbers, partly because of pressure from the electrical engineering department, as complex numbers are used to represent the behavior of alternating current. The imaginary unit square root of -1 was represented by i, which was treated as a fixed complex constant = i.

The complex data type was dropped when Atlas Autocode later evolved into the language Edinburgh IMP. IMP was an extension of AA and was used to write the Edinburgh Multiple Access System (EMAS) operating system.

In addition to being notable as the progenitor of IMP and EMAS, AA is noted for having had many of the features of the original Compiler Compiler. A variant of the AA compiler included run-time support for a top-down recursive descent parser. The style of parser used in the Compiler Compiler was in use continuously at Edinburgh from the 60's until almost the year 2000.

Other Autocodes were developed for the Titan computer, a prototype Atlas 2 at Cambridge, and the Ferranti Mercury.

== Syntax ==
Atlas Autocode's syntax was largely similar to ALGOL, though it was influenced by the output device which the author had available, a Friden Flexowriter. Thus, it allowed symbols like ½ for .5 and the superscript ^{2} for to the power of 2. The Flexowriter supported overstriking and thus, AA did also: up to three characters could be overstruck as a single symbol. For example, the character set had no ↑ symbol, so exponentiation was an overstrike of | and *. The aforementioned underlining of reserved words (keywords) could also be done using overstriking. The language is described in detail in the Atlas Autocode Reference Manual.

Other Flexowriter characters that were found a use in AA were: α in floating-point numbers, e.g., 3.56α-7 for modern 3.56e-7 ; β to mean the second half of a 48-bit Atlas memory word; π for the mathematical constant pi.

When AA was ported to the English Electric KDF9 computer, the character set was changed to International Organization for Standardization (ISO). That compiler has been recovered from an old paper tape by the Edinburgh Computer History Project and is available online, as is a high-quality scan of the original Edinburgh version of the Atlas Autocode manual.

Keywords in AA were distinguishable from other text by being underlined, which was implemented via overstrike in the Flexowriter (compare to bold in ALGOL). There were also two stropping regimes. First, there was an "uppercasedelimiters" mode where all uppercase letters (outside strings) were treated as underlined lowercase. Second, in some versions (but not in the original Atlas version), it was possible to strop keywords by placing a "%" sign in front of them, for example the keyword endofprogramme could be typed as %end %of %programme or %endofprogramme. This significantly reduced typing, due to only needing one character, rather than overstriking the whole keyword. As in ALGOL, there were no reserved words in the language as keywords were identified by underlining (or stropping), not by recognising reserved character sequences. In the statement if token=if then result = token, there is both a keyword if and a variable named if.

As in ALGOL, AA allowed spaces in variable names, such as integer previous value. Spaces were not significant and were removed before parsing in a trivial pre-lexing stage called "line reconstruction". What the compiler would see in the above example would be "iftoken=ifthenresult=token". Spaces were possible due partly to keywords being distinguished in other ways, and partly because the source was processed by scannerless parsing, without a separate lexing phase, which allowed the lexical syntax to be context-sensitive.

The syntax for expressions let the multiplication operator be omitted, e.g., 3a was treated as 3*a, and a(i+j) was treated as a*(i+j) if a was not an array. In ambiguous uses, the longest possible name was taken (maximal munch), for example ab was not treated as a*b, whether or not a and b had been declared.
