= Impy =

Impy may refer to:

- Impy, a character in the comic book series Haunted
- Impy, a character in the 2006 animated film Impy's Island
- Impy, a character in the comic strip Impy & Wormer by James Kochalka
- Impy Series, a line of toy cars produced by Lone Star Toys

== See also ==
- Imp (disambiguation)
