= Stropping =

Stropping may refer to:

- Stropping (blade), a finishing step in sharpening a blade
- Stropping (syntax), a way of marking words as special in a programming language
