= Semantics encoding =

A semantics encoding is a translation between formal languages. For programmers, the most familiar form of encoding is the compilation of a programming language into machine code or byte-code. Conversion between document formats are also forms of encoding. Compilation of TeX or LaTeX documents to PostScript are also commonly encountered encoding processes. Some high-level preprocessors, such as OCaml's Camlp4, also involve encoding of a programming language into another.

Formally, an encoding of a language A into language B is a mapping of all terms of A into B. If there is a satisfactory encoding of A into B, B is considered at least as powerful (or at least as expressive) as A.

== Properties ==
An informal notion of translation is not sufficient to help determine expressivity of languages, as it permits trivial encodings such as mapping all elements of A to the same element of B. Therefore, it is necessary to determine the definition of a "good enough" encoding. This notion varies with the application.

Commonly, an encoding $[\cdot]: A \longrightarrow B$ is expected to preserve a number of properties.

=== Preservation of compositions ===
soundness
For every n-ary operator $op_A$ of A, there exists an n-ary operator $op_B$ of B such that
$$\forall T_A^1,T_A^2,\dots,T_A^n, [op_A(T_A^1,T_A^2,\cdots,T_A^n)] = op_B([T_A^1],[T_A^2],\cdots,[T_A^n])$$
completeness
For every n-ary operator $op_A$ of A, there exists an n-ary operator $op_B$ of B such that
$$\forall T_B^1,T_B^2,\dots,T_B^n, \exists  T_A^1,\dots,T_A^n, op_B(T_B^1,\cdots,T_B^N) = [op_A(T_A^1,T_A^2,\cdots,T_A^n)]$$

(Note: as far as the author is aware of, this criterion of completeness is never used.)

Preservation of compositions is useful insofar as it guarantees that components can be examined either separately or together without "breaking" any interesting property. In particular, in the case of compilations, this soundness guarantees the possibility of proceeding with separate compilation of components, while completeness guarantees the possibility of de-compilation.

=== Preservation of reductions ===
This assumes the existence of a notion of reduction on both language A and language B. Typically, in the case of a programming language, reduction is the relation which models the execution of a program.

We write $\longrightarrow$ for one step of reduction and $\longrightarrow^*$ for any number of steps of reduction.

soundness
For every terms $T_A^1, T_A^2$ of language A, if $T_A^1 \longrightarrow^* T_A^2$ then $[T_A^1] \longrightarrow^* [T_A^2]$.
completeness
For every term $T_A^1$ of language A and every terms $T_B^2$ of language B, if $[T_A^1] \longrightarrow^* T_B^2$ then there exists some $T_A^2$ such that $T_B^2 = [T_A^2]$.

This preservation guarantees that both languages behave the same way. Soundness guarantees that all possible behaviours are preserved while completeness guarantees that no behaviour is added by the encoding. In particular, in the case of compilation of a programming language, soundness and completeness together mean that the compiled program behaves accordingly to the high-level semantics of the programming language.

=== Preservation of termination ===
This also assumes the existence of a notion of reduction on both language A and language B.

soundness
for any term $T_A$, if all reductions of $T_A$ converge, then all reductions of $[T_A]$ converge.
completeness
for any term $[T_A]$, if all reductions of $[T_A]$ converge, then all reductions of $T_A$ converge.

In the case of compilation of a programming language, soundness guarantees that the compilation does not introduce non-termination such as endless loops or endless recursions. The completeness property is useful when language B is used to study or test a program written in language A, possibly by extracting key parts of the code: if this study or test proves that the program terminates in B, then it also terminates in A.

=== Preservation of observations ===
This assumes the existence of a notion of observation on both language A and language B. In programming languages, typical observables are results of inputs and outputs, by opposition to pure computation. In a description language such as HTML, a typical observable is the result of page rendering.

soundness
for every observable $obs_A$ on terms of A, there exists an observable $obs_B$ of terms of B such that for any term $T_A$ with observable $obs_A$, $[T_A]$ has observable $obs_B$.
completeness
for every observable $obs_A$ on terms of A, there exists an observable $obs_B$ on terms of B such that for any term $[T_A]$ with observable $obs_B$, $T_A$ has observable $obs_A$.

=== Preservation of simulations ===
This assumes the existence of notion of simulation on both language A and language B. In a programming languages, a program simulates another if it can perform all the same (observable) tasks and possibly some others. Simulations are used typically to describe compile-time optimizations.

soundness
for every terms $T_A^1, T_A^2$, if $T_A^2$ simulates $T_A^1$ then $[T_A^2]$ simulates $[T_A^1]$.
completeness
for every terms $T_A^1, T_A^2$, if $[T_A^2]$ simulates $[T_A^1]$ then $T_A^2$ simulates $T_A^1$.

Preservation of simulations is a much stronger property than preservation of observations, which it entails. In turn, it is weaker than a property of preservation of bisimulations. As in previous cases, soundness is important for compilation, while completeness is useful for testing or proving properties.

=== Preservation of equivalences ===
This assumes the existence of a notion of equivalence on both language A and language B. Typically, this can be a notion of equality of structured data or a notion of syntactically different yet semantically identical programs, such as structural congruence or structural equivalence.

soundness
if two terms $T_A^1$ and $T_A^2$ are equivalent in A, then $[T_A^1]$ and $[T_A^2]$ are equivalent in B.
completeness
if two terms $[T_A^1]$ and $[T_A^2]$ are equivalent in B, then $T_A^1$ and $T_A^2$ are equivalent in A.

=== Preservation of distribution ===
This assumes the existence of a notion of distribution on both language A and language B. Typically, for compilation of distributed programs written in Acute, JoCaml or E, this means distribution of processes and data among several computers or CPUs.

soundness
if a term $T_A$ is the composition of two agents $T_A^1~|~T_A^2$ then $[T_A]$ must be the composition of two agents $[T_A^1]~|~[T_A^2]$.
completeness
if a term $[T_A]$ is the composition of two agents $T_B^1~|~T_B^2$ then $T_B$ must be the composition of two agents $T_A^1~|~T_A^2$ such that $[T_A^1]=T_B^1$ and $[T_A^2]=T_B^2$.

== See also ==
- Bisimulation
- Compiler
- Semantics
- Semantic dictionary encoding (SDE)
