= Borislav Tsekov =

Bulgarian constitutional lawyer (born 1972)

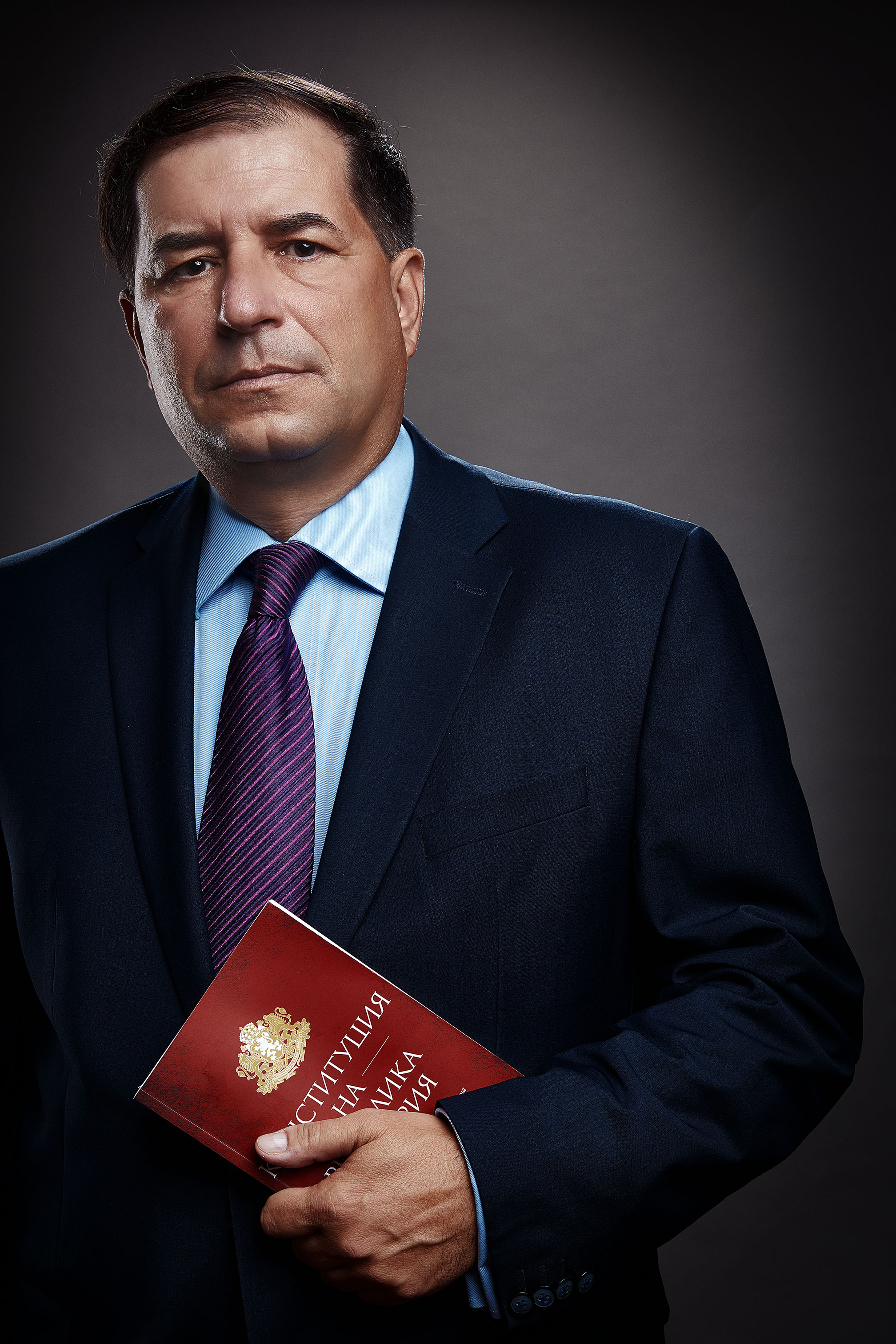
Borislav Tsekov, Professor (Assoc.), Constitutional Law

Borislav Tsekov (Bulgarian: Борислав Цеков) (born 1972) is a Bulgarian constitutional lawyer. Between 2001 and 2005 he served as Member of Parliament, representing the National movement Simeon II until 2004, and then switched to the New Time Party. He was a member of the European Integration Committee, Legal Affairs Committee and the Committee on Local Self-government, Regional Policy and Urban development. He was also elected as Deputy Chairman of the Religious Affairs Ad Hoc Committee and the Ad Hoc Committee on Amendments to the Constitution. As a Member of the Bulgarian Parliament, Borislav Tsekov sponsored more than 30 bills. More than half of these bills were adopted by the Parliament, including Religious Denominations Act, Political Parties Act, State Orders and Medals Act, and others.

Tsekov served as Secretary General of the Ombudsman Institution of the Republic of Bulgaria (2005-2010), a constitutional authority monitoring human rights and good governance issues. In earlier stages of his professional career, Tsekov has worked as NGO and business consultant, legal advisor at the Parliament, lecturer at the New Bulgarian University. Tsekov served as a Member of the Legal Council of Bulgarian Presidency (2017-2019). He is a lecturer in Constitutional law and Public administration at the University of National and World Economy, based in Sofia, Bulgaria.

Tsekov is founder and chair of the Board of directors of the Sofia-based non-profit Institute of Modern Politics. as well as the think-tank New Europe Research Center.

He is author of more than 400 publications on political and legislative issues in the press and law review editions. He published four books: New York: The Altar of the Modern World (2011), Anti-Jewish Legislation in Europe and Bulgaria (2015), The Trump Doctrine (2016), The Trump Doctrine Against Neo-liberal Globalism (2019).

Tsekov has a law degree from the law faculty of Sofia University “St. Clement of Ohrid”, and has gone through some training programs at different institutions in Europe, US and Japan. He has a PhD in Constitutional Law from the Bulgarian Academy of Sciences
