= Paul Laurence Dunbar High School (Maryland) =

Public high school in Maryland, USA

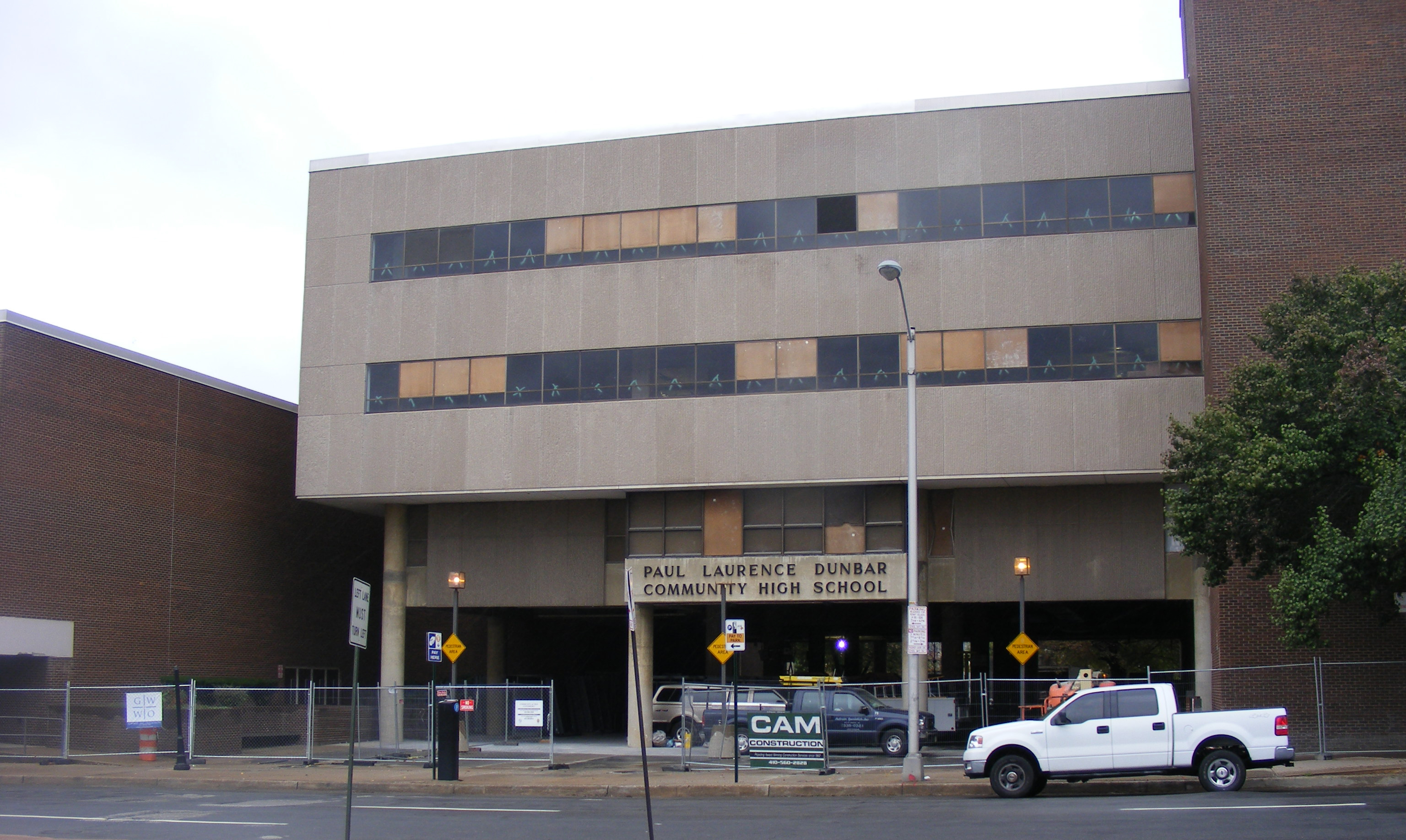

Location
- 1400 Orleans Street; Baltimore, Maryland 21231; United States; 39°17′42″N 76°35′56″W

Information
- Type: Public magnet high school
- Motto: "Learn Today, Lead Tomorrow"
- Founded: 1918; 108 years ago
- School district: Baltimore City Public Schools
- School number: 414
- CEEB code: 210170
- NCES School ID: 240009000298
- Principal: Yetunde Reeves
- Teaching staff: 43 FTE (2022-23)
- Grades: 9–12
- Enrollment: 1,067 (2022-23)
- Student to teacher ratio: 16.33 (2022-23)
- Campus type: Urban
- Colors: Maroon and gold
- Athletics conference: MPSSAA 1A
- Mascot: Owl
- Team name: The Poets (boys); Lady Poets (girls)
- Website: www.baltimorecityschools.org/schools/414

Paul Laurence Dunbar High School is a public high school in Baltimore, Maryland, United States.

== History ==
The school opened in 1918 as the Paul Laurence Dunbar Elementary School, No. 101, named in memory of a famous African-American poet, who had died twelve years before the school opened. The original school, which was around the corner from its present location, was part of the segregated "colored schools" system, which was abolished by the Brown vs Board of Education ruling of 1954. In 1925, it was renamed Dunbar Junior High School, No. 133. In 1940, Dunbar became a high school and awarded its first diploma, the second school for African-Americans in Baltimore to do so. The present school is part of the Baltimore City Public Schools system.

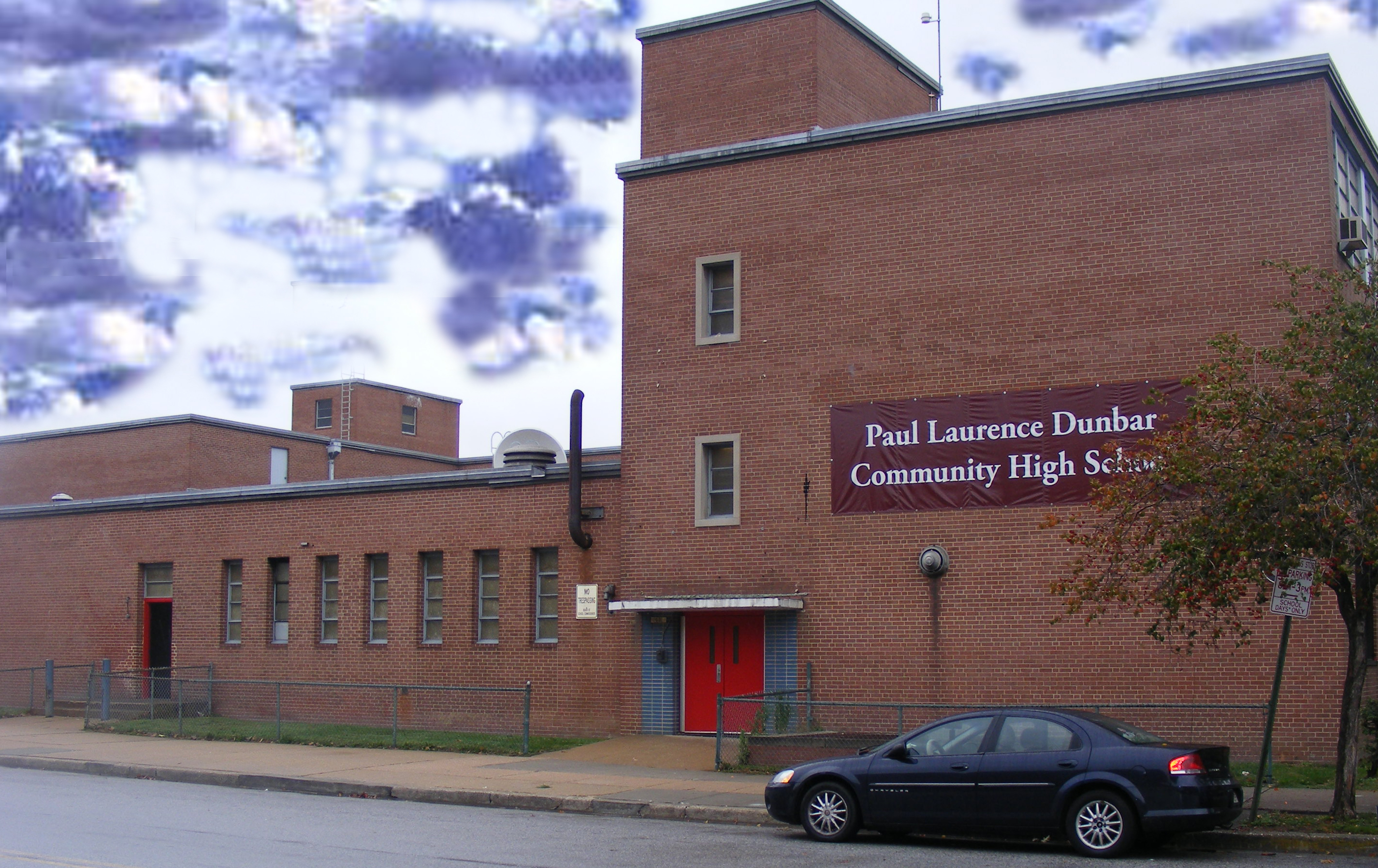
Dunbar's temporary location during renovations

In the summer of 2007, after thirty years of heavy use, the main high school building was emptied for renovations. Students were moved to Thomas G. Hayes Elementary School, behind Dunbar at 601 North Central Avenue. The renovations were completed in late August 2009 with costs totalling $32 million. Renovated features included science and robotics labs, wider interior hallways, larger windows, a new cafeteria, and a new library.

== Academics ==
Dunbar High School is a magnet school, offering biotechnology, emergency medical technology (EMT), accounting, nursing, and health care delivery systems programs. Dunbar High School has been named a Bronze Medal School by U.S. News & World Report.

== Athletics ==
The male varsity sports offered at Dunbar are baseball, basketball, football, soccer, and wrestling. The women's varsity sports offered are badminton, basketball, soccer, softball, and volleyball. The four varsity teams that are coed are cross country, swimming, indoor track and field, and outdoor track and field.

Dunbar's athletic teams have an owl mascot, and are sometimes referred to as "the Poets."

=== Football ===
The Baltimore City Public Schools withdrew from the Maryland Scholastic Association (MSA) in 1993, which it had been part of since 1909, and which formerly segregated schools like Dunbar and Douglass had been part of since 1956. The schools then joined the larger, statewide Maryland Public Secondary Schools Athletic Association (MPSSAA). Since then, the Dunbar football team has won state championships in 1994, 1995, 2004, 2006, 2007, 2008, 2012, 2013, 2017 and 2021.

=== Basketball ===
Since 1993, the school's basketball team has won the State Championship fifteen times. Additionally, the Poets were National Champions in 1983, 1985 and 1992. Dunbar's girls basketball team, the Lady Poets, have excelled as well, winning the state girls basketball title in 2000, 2001, 2002, 2003, 2011 and 2012.

== Community partnerships ==
Dunbar is one of the partner schools of Thread, formerly the Incentive Mentoring Program, an organization formed by Johns Hopkins School of Medicine that tutors high school students to help prevent them from failing high school. Struggling students selected by the principal can receive one-on-one tutoring from Thread mentors, as well as social support to address any personal challenges that may be affecting their school performance.

== Notable alumni ==
=== Business and industry ===
- Reginald F. Lewis, Chairman & CEO, TLC Beatrice Foods International

=== Politics and government ===
- Robert M. Bell, Chief Judge, Maryland Court of Appeals
- Clarence "Tiger" Davis, Maryland House of Delegates, District 45 (1983–2007)
- Ken Harris, Baltimore City Council, District 4

=== Music ===
- Tupac Shakur, rapper and actor(9th grade only)
- Ultra Nate, musician (class of 1986)

=== Film and television ===
- D. Watkins, New York Times Bestselling author, HBO writer

=== Sports ===
==== NFL ====
- Tavon Austin, wide receiver, Dallas Cowboys
- Alfonzo Graham, running back, Pittsburgh Steelers
- Delano Johnson, defensive lineman, Houston Texans
- Tommy Polley, linebacker, St. Louis Rams, New Orleans Saints, Baltimore Ravens
- Bob Wade, defensive back, Washington Redskins
- Calvin Williams, former wide receiver, Philadelphia Eagles; associate athletics director, Purdue University

==== NBA ====
- Keith Booth (class of 1993)
- Muggsy Bogues (class of 1983)
- Sam Cassell (class of 1988)
- Terry Dozier (class of 1985)
- Kurk Lee (class of 1985)
- Reggie Lewis (class of 1983)
- Reggie Williams (class of 1983)
- David Wingate (class of 1982)
- Skip Wise (class of 1974)

== Notable staff ==
- Clarence W. Blount, former principal and member of the Maryland State Senate.
- Clarence H. Burns, locker room attendant and first black Mayor of Baltimore

The following have coached Dunbar's basketball team.

- Keith Booth, assistant coach of University of Maryland and Loyola University Maryland men's basketball teams
- Bob Wade, head coach of University of Maryland men's basketball team, first African-American head basketball coach in the Atlantic Coast Conference
- Sam Cassell, assistant coach of the Boston Celtics
