= Block structure =

Block structure may refer to:

- In mathematics, block structure is a possible property of matrices – see block matrix
- In computer science, a programming language has block structure if it features blocks, which can be nested to any depth
- In linguistics, block structure is a representation of sentence grammar now most commonly associated with the Backus–Naur form. The alternate context-free grammar approach instead is a mathematical notation for operating on sentence grammars.
