= IMPS =

IMPS or Imps may refer to:

== Arts ==
- Imps*, a comedy film released in 2009
- The Oxford Imps, an improvisational comedy troupe

== Computing ==
- Immediate Payment Service, instant payment inter-bank electronic funds transfer system in India
- OMA Instant Messaging and Presence Service
- Infinite Monkey Protocol Suite, an April Fools' Day RFC

== Other ==
- Institutional Meat Purchase Specifications
- Insensitive munition propulsion system
- Inflammatory myopericardial syndrome, umbrella term for myocarditis and pericarditis, introduced by the European Society of Cardiology in 2025

== See also ==
- IMP (disambiguation)
