= The Imp =

The Imp may refer to:

- The Imp (A Song of Ice and Fire), nickname of Tyrion Lannister, a character from the A Song of Ice and Fire series by George R. R. Martin
- The Imp (Little Nemo in Slumberland), a character in the comic strip Little Nemo in Slumberland by Winsor McCay
- The Imp (zine), a comics zine published by Daniel K. Raeburn during the late 1990s early 2000s
- The Imp (1919 film), a 1919 American crime drama film directed by Robert Ellis
- The Imp (1981 film), a 1981 Hong Kong film directed by Dennis Yu
- The Imp (1996 film), a 1996 Hong Kong film directed by Kai Ming Lai
- The Imp (television series), a short animation series created by Andy Fielding
- The Imp (fantasy football manager), a losing fantasy football manager in the FIVER league, played by Gunnar Örn Ingólfsson
- Imp Mountain, New Hampshire, United States

== See also ==
- Imp (disambiguation)
