= Semantic dictionary encoding =

Programming language theory

Semantic dictionary encoding (SDE) preserves the full semantic context of source programs while adding further information that can be used for accelerating the speed of code generation. SDE forms a code-generating loader. It is a form of bytecode combined with a JIT compiler. It is code generation at load time.

In an elementary form, the dictionary entries represent nodes in a directed acyclic graph (DAG), that describes the actions of the program, as an abstract syntax tree (AST) in tabular form.

It uses an intermediate representation (IR), that is based on the encoded abstract syntax tree and symbol table of a program.

== See also ==
- Semantics encoding
- Code generation
- Software portability
