= Atlas Supervisor =

First operating system

- Developer: University of Manchester
- Working state: Historic
- Initial release: 1962; 63 years ago
- Platforms: Atlas Computer
- License: Proprietary

The Atlas Supervisor was the program which managed the allocation of processing resources of Manchester University's Atlas Computer so that the machine was able to act on many tasks and user programs concurrently.

Its various functions included running the Atlas computer's virtual memory (Atlas Supervisor paper, section 3, Store Organisation) and is ‘considered by many to be the first recognisable modern operating system’. Brinch Hansen described it as "the most significant breakthrough in the history of operating systems."
