= International Match Points =

Scoring system in contract bridge

International match points (IMP) within the card game of contract bridge is a measurement for conversion of absolute contract bridge scores. The total point difference between two scores is compared to a scale ranging from 0 to 24 to obtain an IMP score.

Revised IMP table effective September 1, 1962
Point difference		IMPs	Point difference		IMPs	Point difference		IMPs
from	to	IMPs	from	to	IMPs	from	to	IMPs
0	10	0	370	420	9	1750	1990	18
20	40	1	430	490	10	2000	2240	19
50	80	2	500	590	11	2250	2490	20
90	120	3	600	740	12	2500	2990	21
130	160	4	750	890	13	3000	3490	22
170	210	5	900	1090	14	3500	3990	23
220	260	6	1100	1290	15	4000 or more		24
270	310	7	1300	1490	16			
320	360	8	1500	1740	17			

IMP scoring is used in competitive bridge, including duplicate bridge (including on some online bridge websites), but rarely in any kind of companion bridge, and never when playing rubber bridge.

Optimal tactics at IMPs differ from those of matchpoints and are similar to those for rubber bridge. When playing for IMPs the declarer's primary objective is to make the contract without jeopardizing it in a quest for overtricks; for the defense it is to defeat the contract without worrying about surrendering overtricks.
