= Institute of Modern Politics =

Bulgarian independent policy institute

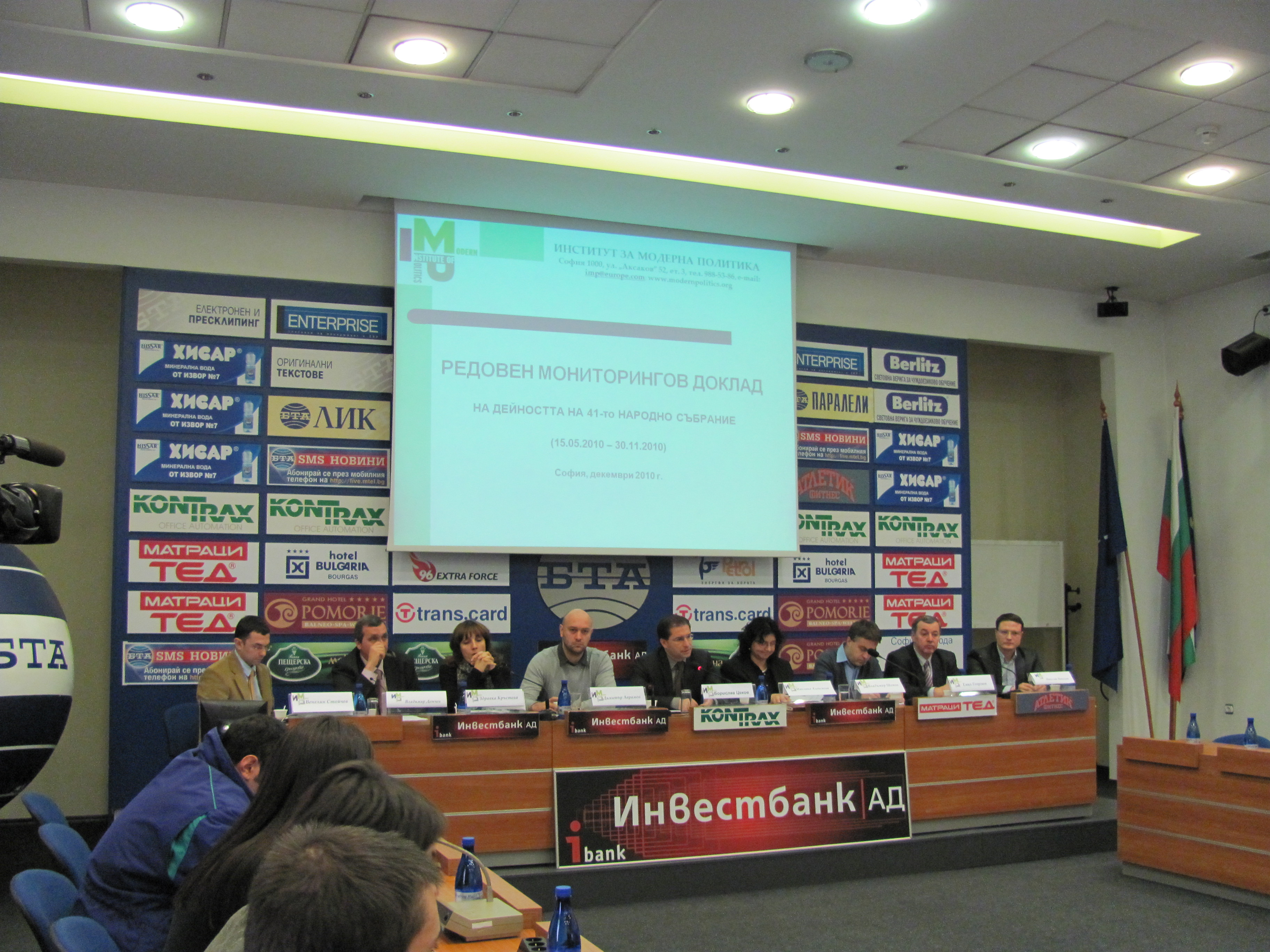
- IMP official press conference to announce monitoring report
- Formation: 2009
- Type: Policy institute
- Headquarters: 1000 Sofia, 57 Batcho Kiro Street, floor 1-2, Bulgaria
- President of Board: Borislav Tsekov
- Website: www.modernpolitics.org

Institute of Modern Politics is an independent policy institute based in Sofia, Bulgaria, EU. It is registered under Bulgarian legislation as a public benefit, non-profit foundation. Its team is multidisciplinary and consists of legal practitioners and scholars, social and political science experts, and economists. Its stated mission is to "be a leading source of independent research on legislative and government policies, and based on that research, to promote informed debate and to provide innovative, practical recommendations that advance good governance and human rights in Bulgaria".

== Publications ==
Institute of Modern Politics Since December 2009 the Institute publishes periodic monitoring reports "State of the Parliamentary Rule". They analyze the legislation passed, parliamentary oversight and conduct of the parliamentary parties and coalitions from civil rights and good governance perspective. Recently IMP issued several special reports on eavesdropping scandal in Bulgaria (2011), the reform of the electoral system, on the legal and political effects of Transatlantic agreement between the EU and the US (TTIP) (2014), on the situation of vulnerable groups and discrimination in Bulgaria (issued on December 10, the International Day of Human Rights). The Institute develops and provides government institutions opinions on draft laws, legislative amendments and improvement of parliamentary procedures.

== Contribution to Bulgarian Constitutional Justice ==
IMP is also an active participant in Bulgarian constitutional justice, after the Constitutional Court of Bulgaria often constitutes organization as a party to important constitutional cases. Opinions of the Institute of constitutional matters and their impact on the practice of the Constitutional Court in the period 2011-2014 are summarized and analyzed in the book "Citizen participation in constitutional justice", 2014.

== Media Freedom Projects ==
In 2011–2015, the Institute of Modern Politics operates a joint project with the German liberal Foundation for Freedom "Friedrich Naumann" on "taboo topics in the Bulgarian print and online media In 2012, the Institute together with one of the leading Bulgarian news agencies BGNES and "Friedrich Naumann" Foundation co-organized two round table discussions "Media Without Filter ", which were broadcast live online [9]. IMP President Borislav Tsekov presented a report "Bulgaria: Fear vs Freedom" at the conference "Media Freedom Under Threat: National Problems, European Solutions?" held in the European Parliament, March 3, 2011, hosted by S&D Group.

== Opinion Polls ==
In 2012, the Institute of Modern Politics started a new program "Opinion Polls". The sociological team of IMP conducts opinion polls and consumer surveys through its own research interviewer network, as well as market research for corporate clients and banks.

== Certificate of Appreciation "For Modern Parliamentarism" ==
In December 2010, IMP established a Certificate of Appreciation "For Modern Parliamentarism". According to the published status of the Certificate, it is honored to "MPs who with their initiatives have contributed to improving the transparency of the parliamentary institution, for better access for citizens and their organizations to the legislative process and active legislative and parliamentary protection of civil rights and freedoms". The first winner of the certificate for 2010 is the Speaker of the 41st National Assembly Tsetska Tsacheva who introduced public registers of parliamentary assistants and legislative proposals recommended by the IMP. 2011 IMP honors diploma Subcommittee parliamentary control special intelligence means "as a sign of recognition for their objective report abuse Ministry of Interior and the security services with the CPC and traffic data" [11

== International Recognition ==
In 2012, the Institute of Modern Politics was awarded Second place "Think tank of Europe 2012" among more than 100 nominations from across Europe. Apparent from the list of winners in the 12 previous ceremonies since 2001, the Institute of Modern Politics is the first think-tank in Eastern Europe, who won this distinction. Prizes are awarded for the 12th consecutive year at a special ceremony at the Royal Society of Great Britain, hosted the British "Prospect Magazine". The prize of the Institute of Modern Politics is presented by Lord Peter Mandelson, former EU Commissioner for Trade and Minister in several British governments. IMP was the runner on first prize at a major European think-tank Bruegel, whose chairman was until recently director of the European Central Bank Jean-Claude Trichet. The reasons for awarding the prize of IMP says: "In second place is the Institute of Modern Politics, based in Sofia, a think tank focused on constitutional and political reform in Bulgaria. Its harsh analysis of the Bulgarian government and security services and of corruption in the courts and politics is not only valuable but brave. The judges felt that attempts to strengthen democracy and the rule of law across southeastern Europe have even more value than in the past, in the light of the Greek turmoil".
