= Brown University International Mentoring Program =

International Mentoring Program (IMP)
- Established: 1999
- Type: Student-based mentoring program
- Headquarters: Brown University, Providence, Rhode Island, U.S.
- Region served: Global (incoming international students at Brown)
- Services: Social, academic, and educational support for incoming international students
- Parent organization: Brown University

The International Mentoring Program (IMP) is a student-based program at Brown University that offers social, academic, and educational support to incoming international students. The aim of the IMP is to assist incoming students in their transition to Brown University and the United States by providing each student with a mentor who provides advice and acts as a resource to them. These mentors are upper classmen who communicate with the international students throughout the academic year to offer support to the new students in their transition.

== History ==
A student initiated the International Mentoring Program in 1999 to offer peer support to incoming international students at Brown University. The students in the program also helped create International Orientation, which was managed by the Office of Admissions and the Office of International Student and Scholar Services (OISSS) at the time. The program also received support from the Dean of college and Office of Student Life in its early years. The Dean of college provided funds while the Office of Student Life helped students in training and in developing the program.

The IMP had changed throughout the years as the international student community and applicants grew at Brown. In 2003, the International Orientation and the IMP were placed under the supervision of the Orientation Welcoming Committee. In 2006, the IMP was separated from General Orientation and incoming international students were allowed to move in a day before general freshmen. In 2011, the IMP supported around 250 new internationals and the International Orientation expanded into a four-day program.

== IMP Mentors and Coordinators ==
=== Mentors ===
The IMP mentors are student volunteers who use their own experience as international students to advise the incoming international freshmen about life at Brown. Students who want to be mentors apply for a position during spring. This is a fairly competitive process as 60-80 students apply for 22 places as a mentor. When the mentors are selected, they begin their work in the summer. The mentors are assigned a region of the world and they communicate with students in the respective regions via email. During this time, mentors introduce themselves to the incoming international freshmen and provide advice about things to bring to Brown.

In the fall, mentors attend training sessions for International Orientation, since they will lead activities. Each mentor is then assigned 10-12 incoming international students who will become his or her mentees. When International Orientation begins, these mentors work by participating in various activities with their mentees during the four-day program. The mentor also acts as a resource and offers advice ranging from academics to social life at the university.

Throughout the year, mentors keep in contact with their mentees through email, by holding office hours, and by other means. They keep mentees informed of IMP events throughout the academic year, such as the IMP BBQ, Pumpkin Carving, ice-skating, etc.

=== Coordinators ===
IMP coordinators serve as mentors but also take on an administrative role. Students in their sophomore year can apply to be an IMP coordinator, a position held onto for two years. Each year, the group of four coordinators consists of 2 juniors and 2 seniors. The coordinators oversee the IMP Program and the International Orientation, and keep in contact with the mentors. For International Orientation, the coordinators organize events and book venues for various activities. IMP coordinators also take part in the mentor selection process for the upcoming academic year.

== Traditions ==
=== Apple Pie Social ===
The Apple Pie Social is an IMP tradition, which occurs during the night of the move-in for international students. This event takes place in the Sayles Auditorium on the Main Green at Brown. It is where all the international students and the IMP mentors come together for a meet-and-greet session. Apple pie, apple cider, and lemonade are provided at the venue. Since most international students have just arrived, the event allows them to meet fellow international freshmen.

=== Welcoming IMP Brunch ===
The IMP Brunch takes place on Lincoln Field, on the Lower Green, the morning after the Apple Pie Social. All the IMP members, the international freshmen, and their families are invited to attend the brunch. This is an event in which the Director of International Admissions and the Vice President of Campus Life and Student Services give speeches to welcome the new members of the Brown community.

== Partnerships ==
=== Office of Admissions ===
The International Mentoring Program works closely with the Office of Admissions during the academic year. As soon as the international students are accepted, the list of their names goes to the IMP. The qualifications of an international student are as follows:

1. A student applies to Brown using a non-American address.
2. A student applies from a non-American high school.
3. A student is a non-US citizen.

When students accept their offer to Brown, they are categorized into groups for the mentors. Mentors will then contact these incoming international students in the summer.

=== Office of International Student and Scholar Services ===
The Office of International Student and Scholar Services (OISSS) helps international students with immigration and visa issues. An event during International Orientation called “The Staying Legal Panel” is led by the Director of OISSS to advise students on employment, immigration, social security, and visa issues. This event is mandatory for all visa students.

== Future Projects ==
As the number of incoming international freshmen increase at Brown, the IMP is looking for new ways to assist the students in their transitions. The IMP may employ more mentors to accommodate the rising number of incoming international students. In 2011, the IMP introduced new events by collaborating with the Writing Center to make students aware of academic writing and plagiarism at Brown. The IMP also plans to start having mentors contact all accepted international students before the summer, instead of only the ones who have enrolled into Brown. The IMP plans to do this in order to make all accepted international freshmen feel a part of the Brown community before they decide to enroll into the university.

== Statistics ==
=== 2011 Numbers ===
- Total number of participating students: 220
- Accompanying family members: 152
- Number of represented countries: 66
- Top 7 represented countries: China, India, South Korea, Canada, United Kingdom, Singapore, and Brazil.

== See also ==
- Brown University
- International student
