= Camlp4 =

Programming software system

Camlp4 is a software system for writing extensible parsers for programming languages. It provides a set of OCaml libraries that are used to define grammars as well as loadable syntax extensions of such grammars. Camlp4 stands for Caml Preprocessor and Pretty-Printer and one of its most important applications was the definition of domain-specific extensions of the syntax of OCaml.

Camlp4 was part of the official OCaml distribution which is developed at the INRIA. Its original author is Daniel de Rauglaudre. OCaml version 3.10.0, released in May 2007, introduced a significantly modified and backward-incompatible version of Camlp4. De Rauglaudre maintains a separate backward-compatible version, which has been renamed Camlp5. All of the examples below are for Camlp5 or the previous version of Camlp4 (versions 3.09 and prior).

Version 4.08, released in the summer of 2019, was the last official version of this library. It is currently deprecated; instead, it is recommended to use the PPX (PreProcessor eXtensions) libraries.

== Concrete and abstract syntax ==
A Camlp4 preprocessor operates by loading a collection of compiled modules which define a parser as well as a pretty-printer: the parser converts an input program into an internal representation. This internal representation constitutes the abstract syntax tree (AST). It can be output in a binary form, e.g. it can be passed directly to one of the OCaml compilers, or it can be converted back into a clear text program. The notion of concrete syntax refers to the format in which the abstract syntax is represented.

For instance, the OCaml expression (1 + 2) can also be written ((+) 1 2) or (((+) 1) 2). The difference is only at the level of the concrete syntax, since these three versions are equivalent representations of the same abstract syntax tree. As demonstrated by the definition of a revised syntax for OCaml, the same programming language can use different concrete syntaxes. They would all converge to an abstract syntax tree in a unique format that a compiler can handle.

The abstract syntax tree is at the center of the syntax extensions, which are in fact OCaml programs. Although the definition of grammars must be done in OCaml, the parser that is being defined or extended is not necessarily related to OCaml, in which case the syntax tree that is being manipulated is not the one of OCaml. Several libraries are provided which facilitate the specific manipulation of OCaml syntax trees.

== Fields of application ==
Domain-specific languages are a major application of Camlp4. Since OCaml is a multi-paradigm language, with an interactive toplevel and a native code compiler, it can be used as a backend for any kind of original language. The only thing that the developer has to do is write a Camlp4 grammar which converts the domain-specific language in question into a regular OCaml program. Other target languages can also be used, such as C.

If the target language is OCaml, simple syntax add-ons or syntactic sugar can be defined, in order to provide an expressivity which is not easy to achieve using the standard features of the OCaml language. A syntax extension is defined by a compiled OCaml module, which is passed to the camlp4o executable along with the program to process.

Camlp4 includes a domain-specific language as it provides syntax extensions which ease the development of syntax extensions. These extensions allow a compact definition of grammars (EXTEND statements) and quotations such as <:expr< 1 + 1 >>, i.e. deconstructing and constructing abstract syntax trees in concrete syntax.

== Example ==
The following example defines a syntax extension of OCaml. It provides a new keyword, memo, which can be used as a replacement for function and provides automatic memoization of functions with pattern matching. Memoization consists in storing the results of previous computations in a table so that the actual computation of the function for each possible argument occurs at most once.

This is pa_memo.ml, the file which defines the syntax extension:

let unique =
  let n = ref 0 in
  fun () -> incr n; "__pa_memo" ^ string_of_int !n

EXTEND
  GLOBAL: Pcaml.expr;

  Pcaml.expr: LEVEL "expr1" [
    [ "memo"; OPT "|"; pel = LIST1 match_case SEP "|" ->
      let tbl = unique () in
      let x = unique () in
      let result = unique () in
      <:expr< 
      let $lid:tbl$ = Hashtbl.create 100 in
      fun $lid:x$ ->
        try Hashtbl.find $lid:tbl$ $lid:x$ 
        with [ Not_found -> 
                let $lid:result$ = match $lid:x$ with [ $list:pel$ ] in
                do { Hashtbl.replace $lid:tbl$ $lid:x$ $lid:result$; 
                     $lid:result$ } ]
      >> ]
  ];

  match_case: [
    [ p = Pcaml.patt; w = OPT [ "when"; e = Pcaml.expr -> e ]; 
      "->"; e = Pcaml.expr -> 
       (p, w, e) ]
  ];
END

Example of program using this syntax extension:

let counter = ref 0 (* global counter of multiplications *)

(* factorial with memoization *)
let rec fac = memo
    0 -> 1
  | n when n > 0 -> 
      (incr counter;
       n * fac (n - 1))
  | _ -> invalid_arg "fac"

let run n =
  let result = fac n in
  let count = !counter in
  Printf.printf "%i! = %i     number of multiplications so far = %i\n"
    n result count 

let _ =
  List.iter run [5; 4; 6]

The output of the program is as follows, showing that the fac function (factorial) only computes products that were not computed previously:

5! = 120     number of multiplications so far = 5
4! = 24     number of multiplications so far = 5
6! = 720     number of multiplications so far = 6
