= Thread (non-profit organization) =

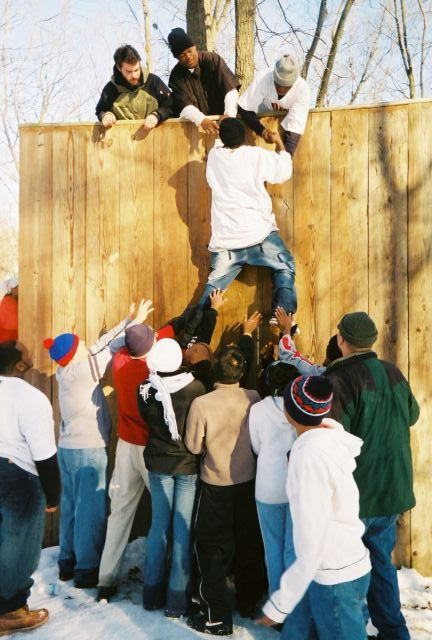

Location
- PO Box 1584; Baltimore, MD, 21203

Information
- Motto: Mentors and students develop teamwork and problem-solving skills on a Challenging Outdoor Physical Experience (COPE) course
- Website: thread.org

Thread (formerly known as Incentive Mentoring Program or IMP) is a 501(c)(3) non-profit organization that was founded by Sarah and Ryan Hemminger as a partnership between students at Johns Hopkins University and two Baltimore City High Schools: Paul Laurence Dunbar High School (Baltimore, Maryland) and the Academy for College and Career Exploration . The goal of Thread is to transform teenagers who are failing high school into Baltimore City's most valuable role models. Thread extends a school-based tutoring program to the home, providing both academic and social support to youth struggling with poverty, drugs, and violence. Mentoring teams, called "Thread Families" not only support teenagers in overcoming their own adversity, but also encourage them to help others do the same. The first group of Thread students achieved a 100% graduation and 100% college enrollment rate.

== Target participants ==
Thread's philosophy is that its mentors should learn just as much from the high-school students as these teenagers learn from them.

=== Teenagers ===
High School freshman who have failed at least 50% of their courses and face one of the following psychosocial challenges are selected to join Thread and receive support through college graduation.

- School Suspension
- Substance Abuse
- Gang Violence
- Sexual Assault
- Poverty
- Temporary Homelessness
- Burdensome Financial Obligation to Household
- Learning Disability
- Depression
- Incarcerated Parent

=== Health professionals in training ===
Thread's mentors are medical, public health, and nursing students who personally witness the challenges teenagers face. These future health professionals develop experience with urban health issues and promoting behavior change.

== Mentoring model ==
Thread has a "family style" mentoring, in which a team of 5-6 mentors is matched with each child and is responsible for adapting to his/her unique needs. Thread Families coach life skills through activities based on 3 elements: academic assistance, community service, and team-building. As needed, these teams connect students and their families with rehabilitation and other social services. This model was designed to meet the comprehensive needs of the students without overburdening volunteers.

=== Academic assistance ===
Mentors serve as tutors, advocates, and counselors for students. Johns Hopkins graduate students hold 1-on-1 after-school tutoring sessions twice weekly. Volunteers also coach organizational skills, seek regular feedback from teachers, and navigate the college application and financial aid processes.

=== Community service ===
At first, the primary concern of many Thread students is self-preservation. Their perspectives shift when they are put in the position of giving to others. Thread Alumni say that participating in service projects gave them a sense of purpose and hope for the future.

=== Team-building ===
Thread encourages students to rely on each other as well as their network of mentors. Field trips such as camping and high-ropes courses are designed to develop trust, communication skills, and problem solving ability.

== Community service awards ==
Thread has received service awards from both local and national organizations.

- Echoing Green Fellowship Semifinalist 2008
- Baltimore Albert Schweitzer Fellowship 2004, 2005, 2006, 2008
- SOURCE School of Medicine Individual Community Service Award presented to mentors in 2005, 2007
- Martin Luther King Junior Community Service Award 2006
- Boy Scouts of America, Scoutreach Whitney M Young Jr. National Service Award
- Spirit of Scouting Leadership Award 2007

== Community service partnerships ==
Thread mentors and students participate side-by-side in monthly community service projects benefiting organizations throughout Maryland.

- Maryland Food Bank
- New Life for Girls
- The Club at Collington Square Middle School
- Bluford Drew Jemison Academy
- St. Francis Academy Community Center
- Johns Hopkins SOURCE (Student Outreach Resource Center)
