= Languages used on the internet =

Slightly over half of the homepages of the most visited websites on the World Wide Web are in English, with varying amounts of information available in many other languages. Other top languages are Chinese, Spanish, Russian, Portuguese, French, German and Japanese.

Of the more than 7,000 existing languages, only a few hundred are recognized as being in use for Web pages on the World Wide Web.

== Languages used ==
There is debate over the most-used languages on the internet. A 2009 UNESCO report monitoring the languages of websites for 12 years, from 1996 to 2008, found a steady year-on-year decline in the percentage of webpages in English, from 75 percent in 1998 to 45 percent in 2005. The authors found that English remained at 45 percent of content for 2005 to the end of the study but believe this was due to the bias of search engines indexing more English-language content rather than a true stabilization of the percentage of content in English on the World Wide Web.

The number of non-English web pages is rapidly expanding. The use of English online increased by around 281 percent from 2001 to 2011, a lower rate of growth than that of Spanish (743 percent), Chinese (1,277 percent), Russian (1,826 percent) or Arabic (2,501 percent) over the same period.

According to a 2000 study, the international auxiliary language Esperanto ranked 40 out of all languages in search engine queries, also ranking 27 out of all languages that rely on the Latin script.

== Usage statistics of content languages for websites ==
As of 3 December 2025, the following table lists the forty most commonly used content languages among the top 10 million websites on the World Wide Web, according to estimates by W3Techs.

Rank	Language	15 May 2023	3 December 2025
1	English	55.5%	49.3%
2	Spanish	5.0%	6.0%
3	German	4.3%	5.9%
4	Japanese	3.7%	5.1%
5	French	4.4%	4.5%
6	Portuguese	2.4%	4.1%
7	Russian	4.9%	3.7%
8	Italian	1.9%	2.8%
9	Dutch	1.5%	2.2%
10	Polish	1.4%	1.8%
11	Turkish	2.3%	1.6%
12	Chinese	1.4%	1.1%
13	Persian	1.8%	1.1%
14	Vietnamese	1.3%	1.0%
15	Czech	0.7%	1.0%
16	Indonesian	0.7%	1.0%
17	Korean	0.7%	0.8%
18	Ukrainian	0.6%	0.7%
19	Hungarian	0.4%	0.7%
20	Arabic	0.7%	0.5%
21	Swedish	0.5%	0.5%
22	Romanian	0.4%	0.5%
23	Greek	0.5%	0.5%
24	Danish	0.3%	0.4%
25	Finnish	0.3%	0.4%
26	Hebrew	0.5%	0.4%
27	Slovak	0.3%	0.4%
28	Thai	0.4%	0.3%
29	Bulgarian	0.2%	0.3%
30	Croatian	0.2%	0.2%
31	Norwegian Bokmål	0.1%	0.2%
32	Lithuanian	0.1%	0.2%
33	Serbian	0.3%	0.2%
34	Slovenian	0.1%	0.1%
35	Catalan, Valencian	0.1%	0.1%
36	Estonian	0.1%	0.1%
37	Norwegian	0.1%	0.1%
38	Latvian	0.1%	0.1%

All other languages are used in less than 0.1% of websites. Even including all languages, percentages may not sum to 100% because some websites contain multiple content languages.

The figures from the W3Techs study are based on the one million most visited websites (i.e., approximately 0.27 percent of all websites according to December 2011 figures) as ranked by Alexa.com, and language is identified using only the home page of the sites in most cases (e.g., all of Wikipedia is based on the language detection of http://www.wikipedia.org). As a consequence, the figures show a significantly higher percentage for many languages (especially for English) as compared to the figures for all websites. For all websites, estimates are between 20 and 50% for English.

== Most used scripts on the internet ==
#	Script	%
1	Latin	85.2%
2	Kanji & Kana	5.1%
3	Cyrillic	4.8%
4	Arabic	1.7%
5	Hanzi	1.2%
6	Hangul	0.8%
7	Greek	0.5%
8	Hebrew	0.4%
9	Thai	0.3%
10	Devanagari	0.1%

== Content languages on YouTube ==
Of the top 250 YouTube channels, 66% of the content is in English, 15% in Spanish, 7% in Portuguese, 5% in Hindi, and 2% in Korean, while other languages make up 5%. YouTube is available in over 80 languages with more than a hundred different local versions. Of those popular YouTube channels that posted a video in the first week of 2019, just over half contained some content in a language other than English.

YouTube does not publish an official real-time breakdown of platform-wide language distribution. Analysis of available data suggests that English-language content commands the largest share of viewership across the platform's most-watched channels, though non-English content represents a growing proportion of overall views as the platform expands in markets including India, Brazil, and Southeast Asia. Spanish ranks second among the most represented languages across top channels, driven by large audiences in Latin America and Spain. Portuguese ranks highly due to the scale of YouTube consumption in Brazil.

As of early 2025, YouTube's advertising tools reported approximately 2.53 billion ad-reachable users globally, reflecting the platform's reach across multiple language markets. YouTube has also introduced multilingual features including support for uploaded dubbed audio tracks and automatic dubbing, which allow creators to make content accessible across language boundaries without producing entirely separate uploads.

== Internet users by language ==
InternetWorldStats estimates of the number of internet users by language as of March 31, 2020:

Rank	Language	Internet users	Percentage
1	English	1,186,451,052	25.9%
2	Chinese	888,453,068	19.4%
3	Spanish	363,684,593	7.9%
4	Arabic	237,418,349	5.2%
5	Indonesian	198,029,815	4.3%
6	Portuguese	171,750,818	3.7%
7	French	144,695,288	3.3%
8	Japanese	118,626,672	2.6%
9	Russian	116,353,942	2.5%
10	German	92,525,427	2.0%
1–10	Top 10 languages	3,525,027,347	76.9%
–	Others	1,060,551,371	23.1%
Total		4,585,578,718	100%

== Wikipedia page views by language ==
Most popular edition of Wikipedia by country as of Dec 2022. In greyed-out countries, the "national-language" edition is usually the most popular, but there are exceptions.

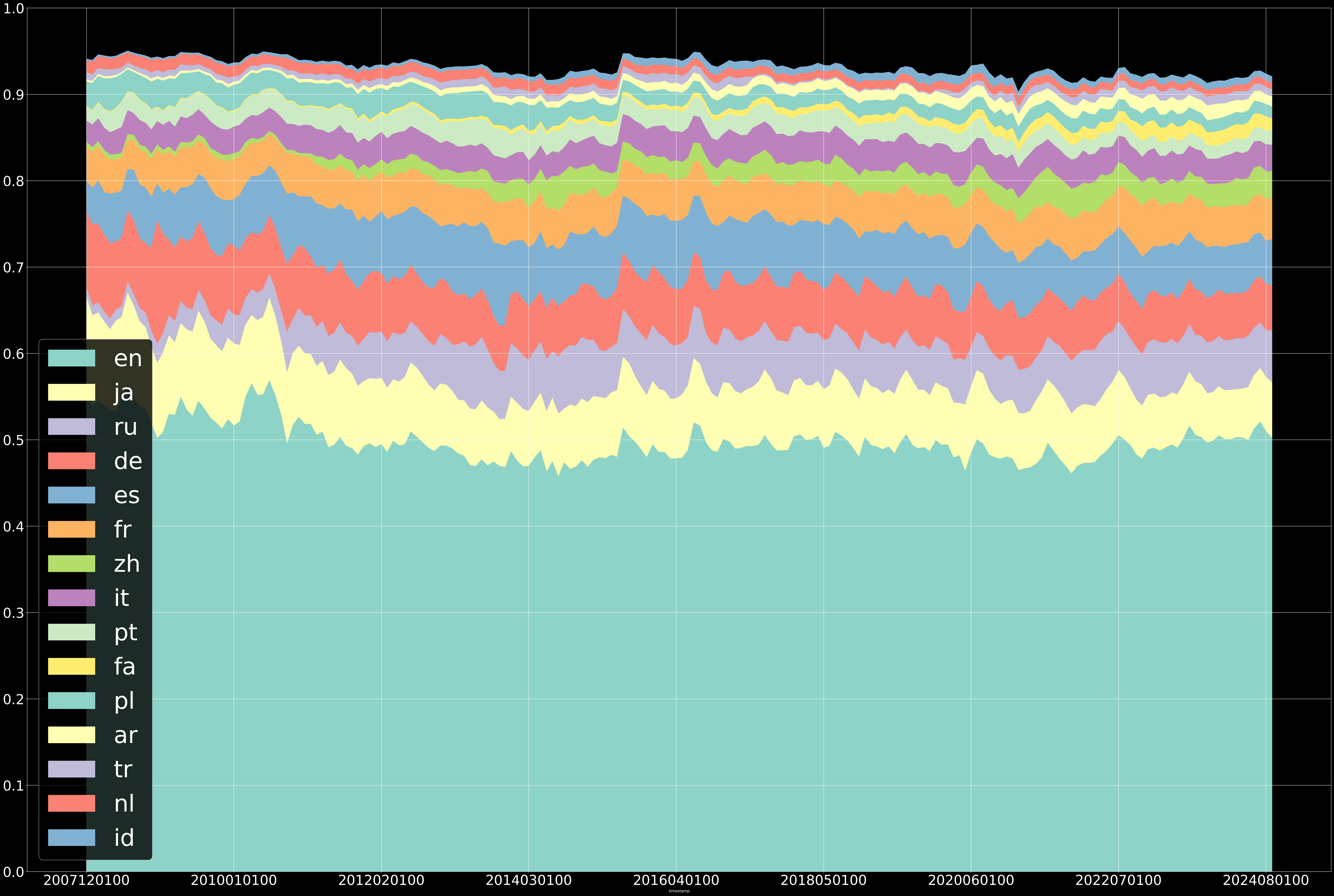
Most viewed editions of Wikipedia over time. The ranking reflects the most recent month in the data (Sep 2024).

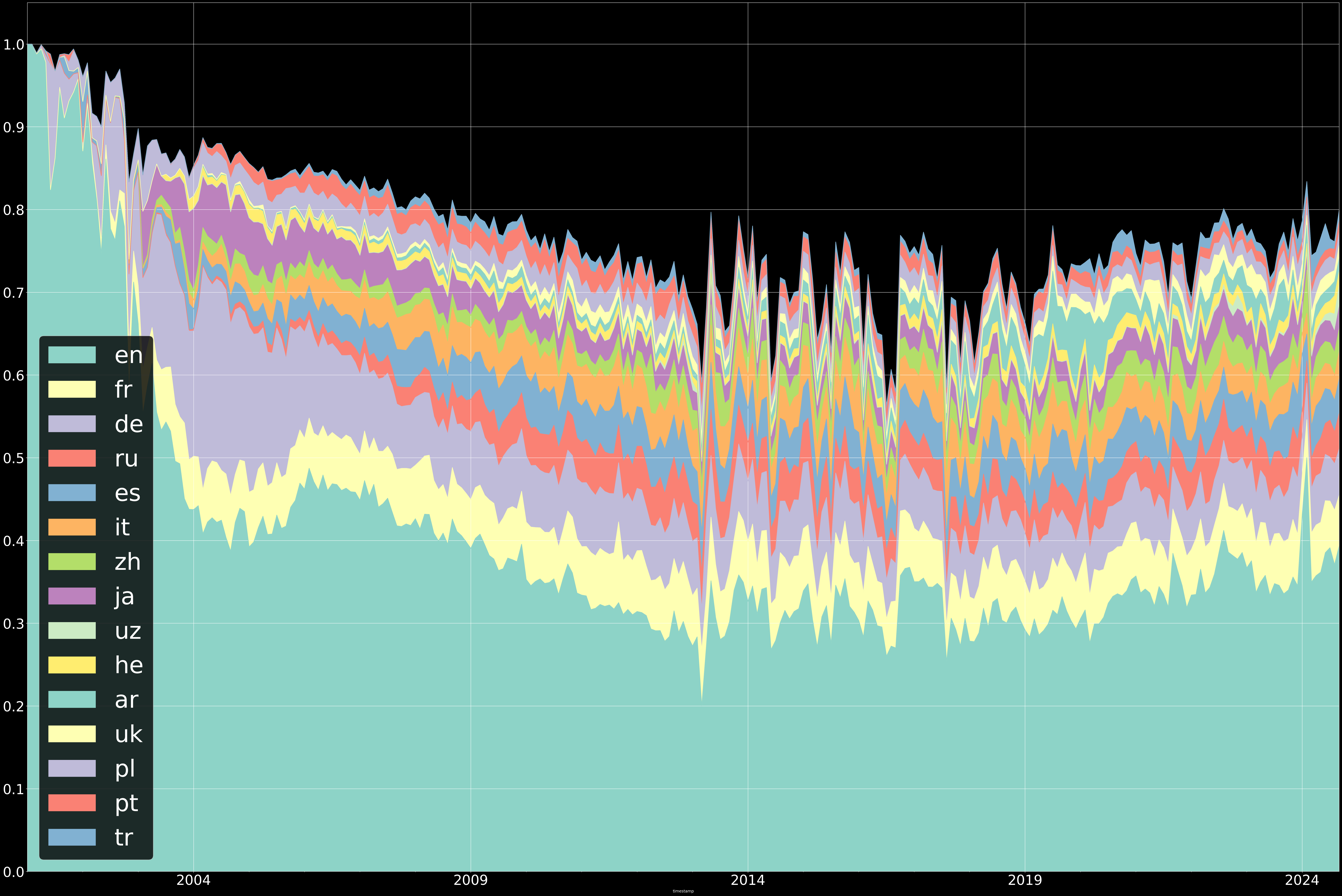
Most edited editions of Wikipedia over time. The ranking reflects the most recent month in the data (Sep 2024).

The Wikimedia Analytics API provides the most recent data on page views and page edits, among other statistics, for all language editions of Wikipedia.

Rank	Language of Wikipedia edition	Average daily page views by humans (from 10/8/2023 to 10/8/2024)
1	English	253,610,218
2	Japanese	29,741,657
3	Russian	29,008,708
4	Spanish	27,436,473
5	German	26,790,751
6	French	22,913,851
7	Italian	15,306,223
8	Chinese	14,975,873
9	Persian	8,148,931
10	Portuguese	7,813,004
11	Polish	7,151,202
12	Arabic	7,135,389
13	Turkish	4,825,138
14	Indonesian	3,976,393
15	Dutch	3,934,187

== See also ==
- Computer technology for developing areas – Donation of technology to developing areas
- English in computing – English as lingua franca of programming and computer science
- Global digital divide – Global disparities in regards to access to computing and information resources
- Great Firewall – Chinese internet regulations
- Internationalization and localization – Process of making software accessible worldwide
  - Language localisation – Product Management Discipline
  - Website localization – Website adaptation process
- Internet in China
- Internet in Russia
- Internet censorship and surveillance by country
- Language observatory – Project for measuring language activity in a society
- List of sovereign states by number of broadband Internet subscriptions
- List of sovereign states by number of Internet hosts
- List of countries by number of Internet users
- Multilingualism – Use of multiple languages
- Rural Internet – Internet service in rural areas
- Unicode – Character encoding standard
