= English in computing =

English as lingua franca of programming and computer science

The English language is sometimes described as the lingua franca of computing. Computer science utilizes English as its primary conduit.

The prevalence of English in computing is a consequence of both historical and technical factors. The United States and the United Kingdom — both countries with English-speaking majorities — had prominent roles in the development and popularization of computer systems, computer networks, software and information technology.

Moreover, the technical limitations of early computers, combined with the lack of international standardization on the Internet, meant that English continued to dominate computing until innovations in internet infrastructure and increases in computer speed changed these earlier conditions. The domination of English, however, should not overshadow the technological innovations and additions to computer science that utilize other languages. Also, many widely used English-based technologies were not produced in the United States or the United Kingdom. For example, Ruby was made in Japan.

While English is still influential to various other languages with regard to computers and computing technologies, now most software products are localized in numerous languages and the invention of Unicode character encoding has resolved problems with non-Latin alphabets.

== History ==
Computer science has an ultimately mathematical foundation which was laid by non-English speaking cultures. The first mathematically literate societies in the Ancient Near East recorded methods for solving mathematical problems in steps. The word 'algorithm' comes from the name of a famous medieval Arabic mathematician who contributed to the spread of Hindu-Arabic numerals, al-Khwārizmī. The first systematic treatment of binary numbers was completed by Leibniz, a German mathematician. Leibniz wrote his treatise on the topic in French, the lingua franca of science at the time, and innovations in what is now called computer hardware occurred outside of an English tradition, with Pascal inventing the first mechanical calculator, and Leibniz improving it.

Interest in building computing machines first emerged in the 19th century, with the coming of the Second Industrial Revolution. The origins of computing in an English tradition began in this era with Charles Babbage's conceptualization of the Difference and Analytical Engine, George Boole's work on logic, and Herman Hollerith's invention of the tabulating machine for specific use in the 1890 United States census. At the time, Britain enjoyed near complete hegemonic power in the West at the height of the Pax Britannica, and America was experiencing an economic and demographic boom. By the time of the interwar period in the early 20th century, the most important mathematics related to the development of computing was being done in English, which was also beginning to become the new lingua franca of science.

In recent years, some scholars have begun to more critically study the dominance of the English language in computing. For instance, the historian Thomas Mullaney studies how Chinese computing responded to the problem of the QWERTY keyboard, which by nature of its limited key selection was not initially very accessible for Chinese computer users due to the difference between the English and Chinese languages. In his book The Chinese Computer: A Global History of the Information Age, he examines the innovative strategies that Chinese computer users have used to overcome this challenge, among others. Meanwhile, the scholar Mark Warschauer has studied internet usage across different global contexts, writing about how an over-abundance of digital information is available in English, but a significantly less amount of information is available in other languages, something that poses a problem for social inclusion.

Despite English being the standard for programming languages, non-Western countries developed many widely used programming languages. Python, one of the most popular programming languages, was created in the Netherlands by Guido van Rossum in 1991. Additionally, in Japan, Ruby, a programming language mainly used for web development, was created by Yukihiro "Matz" Matsumoto in the mid-1990s. English was considered more appropriate for the international development community. Based on French keywords, Langage Symbolique d'Enseignement – Symbolic Language for Teaching (LSE) sprouted out of France for beginner programmers, and its failure is attributed to that lack of French knowledge globally. As a result, PASCAL was developed in English while germinating in Switzerland.

== Influence on other languages ==
The computing terminology of many languages borrows from English. Some language communities actively resist this trend, and in other cases English is used extensively and more directly. This section gives some examples of the use of English loans in other languages and mentions any notable differences.

=== Bulgarian ===
Both English and Russian have had influence over Bulgarian computing vocabulary. In many cases, however, the borrowed word is translated into Bulgarian rather than transcribed phonetically from English. Combined with the use of Cyrillic this can make it difficult to recognize loanwords. For example, the Bulgarian term for motherboard is дънна платка (IPA: [ˈdɤnna ˈplatka]), literally "bottom board".

- компютър (IPA: [komˈpjutɤr]) – computer
- твърд диск (IPA: [tvɤrt disk]) – hard disk (i.e., hard drive)
- дискета (IPA: [diˈskɛtɐ]) – floppy disk; like the French disquette
- уебсайт (IPA: [ˈwɛbsɐjt]) – web site; but also интернет страница (IPA: [ˈintɛrnɛt ˈstranit͡sɐ]), literally "internet page"

=== Faroese ===
The Faroese language has a sparse scientific vocabulary based on the language itself. Many Faroese scientific words are borrowed and/or modified versions of especially Nordic and English equivalents. The vocabulary is constantly evolving and thus new words often die out, and only a few survive and become widely used. Examples of successful words include e.g. "telda" (computer), "kurla" (at sign) and "ambætari" (server).

=== French ===
In French, there are some generally accepted English loanwords, but there is also a distinct effort to avoid them. In France, the Académie française is responsible for the standardisation of the language and often coins new technological terms. Some of them are accepted in practice, but oftentimes the English loans remain predominant. In Quebec, the Office québécois de la langue française has a similar function.

- email/mail (in Europe); courriel (mainly in French-speaking Canada, but increasingly used in French-speaking Europe); mél. (only used as an abbreviation, similar to "tél."); more formally courrier électronique
- pourriel – spam
- hameçonnage, phishing – phishing
- télécharger – to download
- site web – website
- lien, hyperlien – website hyper-link
- base de données – database
- caméra web, webcaméra, short webcam – webcam
- amorcer, démarrer, booter – to boot
- redémarrer, rebooter – to reboot
- arrêter, éteindre – to shut down
- amorçable, bootable – bootable
- surfréquençage, surcadençage, overclocking – overclocking
- refroidissement à l'eau – watercooling
- tuning PC – case modding

=== German ===
In German, English words are very often used as well:

- nouns: Computer, Website, Software, E-Mail, Blog
- verbs: downloaden, booten, crashen

=== Japanese ===
Japanese uses the katakana alphabet for foreign loanwords, a wide variety of which are in use today. English computing terms remain prevalent in modern Japanese vocabulary.

- コンピューター (konpyūtā) - computer
- コーダー (kōdā) - coder
- コーデック (kōdekku) - codec
- ダウンロード (daunrōdo) - download
- リンク (rinku) - link

Utilizing a keyboard layout suitable for romanization of Japanese, a user may type in the Latin script in order to display Japanese, inclusive of hiragana, katakana, and Japanese kanji.

Usually when writing in Japanese on a computer keyboard, the text is input in roman transcription, optionally according to Hepburn, Kunrei, or Nippon romanization; the common Japanese word processing programs allow for all three. Long vowels are input according to how they are written in kana; for example, a long o is input as ou, instead of an o with a circumflex or macron (ô or ō). As letters are keyed in, they are automatically converted, as specified, into either hiragana or katakana. And these kana phrases are in turn converted, as desired, into kanji.

=== Icelandic ===
The Icelandic language has its own vocabulary of scientific terms. Still, English loans exist, and are mostly used in casual conversation, whereas the Icelandic words might be longer or not as widespread.

=== Italian ===
In Italian, most words related to computing are left in English, with few Italian native words being used, these latter ones usually relegated to describe the early versions of such products (as an example, computer is the go-to word in Italian, with calcolatore being used almost exclusively for punch-card computers) or may be avoided entirely if the metaphor does not translate easily (e.g. mouse; contrast with finestra being used to translate a window).

=== Norwegian ===
It's quite common to use English words with regards to computing in all Scandinavian languages.

nouns: mail (referring to e-mail), software, blogg (from "blog"), spam

verbs: å boote, å spamme, å blogge

=== Polish ===
Polish terminology derived from English:

- dżojstik: joystick
- kartrydż, kartridż: cartridge
- interfejs: interface
- mejl: e-mail

=== Russian ===
- History of computer hardware in Eastern Bloc countries
- Computer Russification

=== Spanish ===
The English influence on the software industry and the internet in Latin America has borrowed significantly from the Castilian lexicon.

Frequently untranslated, and their Spanish equivalent

- email: correo electrónico
- mouse (only in Latin America): ratón (mainly in Spain)
- messenger: mensajero (only in Spain)
- webcam: cámara web, webcam
- website: página web, sitio web
- blog: bitácora, blog
- ban/banned: baneado (Latin America), vetar, vetado
- web: red, web

Not translated

- flog
- download

Undecided

Many computing terms in Spanish share a common root with their English counterpart. In these cases, both terms are understood, but the Spanish is preferred for formal use:

- link vs enlace or vínculo
- net vs red

== Character encoding ==
Early computer software and hardware had very little support for character sets other than the Latin alphabet. As a result, it was difficult or impossible to represent languages based on other scripts. The ASCII character encoding, created in the 1960s, usually only supported 128 different characters in a 7 bit format. With the use of additional software it was possible to provide support for some languages, for instance those based on the Cyrillic alphabet. However, complex-script and logographic languages like Chinese or Japanese need more characters than the 256 limit imposed by 8-bit character encodings. Some computers created in the former USSR had native support for the Cyrillic alphabet.

The widespread adoption of Unicode, and UTF-8 on the web, resolved most of these historical limitations. ASCII remains the de facto standard for command interpreters, programming languages and text-based communication protocols, but it is slowly dying out.

- Mojibake – Text presented as "unreadable" when software fails due to character encoding issues.

== Programming language ==
The syntax of most programming languages uses English keywords, and therefore it could be argued some knowledge of English is required in order to use them. Some studies have shown that programmers nonnative to English self-report that English is their biggest obstacle to programming proficiency. However, it is important to recognize all programming languages are in the class of formal languages. They are very different from any natural language, including English.

Some examples of non-English programming languages:

- Arabic: ARLOGO, قلب
- Bengali: BangaBhasha
- Chinese: Chinese BASIC
- Dutch: Superlogo
- French: LSE, WinDev, Pascal (although the English version is more widespread)
- Hebrew: Hebrew Programming Language
- Icelandic: Fjölnir
- Indian Languages: Hindawi Programming System
- Russian: Glagol
- Portuguese: Portugol

== Communication protocols ==
Many application protocols use text strings for requests and parameters, rather than the binary values commonly used in lower layer protocols. The request strings are generally based on English words, although in some cases the strings are contractions or acronyms of English expressions, which can render them somewhat cryptic to anyone not familiar with the protocol, whatever their proficiency in English. Nevertheless, the use of word-like strings is a convenient mnemonic device that allows a person skilled in the art (and with sufficient knowledge of English) to execute the protocol manually from a keyboard, usually for the purpose of finding a problem with the service.

Examples:

- FTP: USER, PASS (password), PASV (passive), PORT, RETR (retrieve), STOR (store), QUIT
- SMTP: HELO (hello), MAIL, RCPT (recipient), DATA, QUIT
- HTTP: GET, PUT, POST, HEAD (headers), DELETE, TRACE, OPTIONS

It is notable that response codes, that is, the strings sent back by the recipient of a request, are typically numeric: for instance, in HTTP (and some borrowed by other protocols)

- 200 OK request succeeded
- 301 Moved Permanently to redirect the request to a new address
- 404 Not Found the requested page does not exist

This is because response codes also need to convey unambiguous information, but can have various nuances that the requester may optionally use to vary its subsequent actions. To convey all such "sub-codes" with alphabetic words would be unwieldy, and negate the advantage of using pseudo-English words. Since responses are usually generated by software they do not need to be mnemonic. Numeric codes are also more easily analyzed and categorized when they are processed by software, instead of a human testing the protocol by manual input.

== Localization ==
=== BIOS/UEFI ===
Many personal computers have a BIOS or UEFI firmware chip, displaying text in English during boot time and in configuration screen.

=== Keyboard shortcut ===
Keyboard shortcuts are usually defined in terms of English keywords such as CTRL+F for find.

== English on the World Wide Web ==
English is the largest language on the World Wide Web, with over 25% of internet users.

=== English speakers ===
Web user percentages usually focus on raw comparisons of the first language of those who access the web. Just as important is a consideration of second- and foreign-language users; i.e., the first language of a user does not necessarily reflect which language he or she regularly employs when using the web.

==== Native speakers ====
English-language users appear to be a plurality of web users, consistently cited as around one-third of the overall (near one billion). This reflects the relative affluence of English-speaking countries and high Internet penetration rates in them. This lead may be eroding due mainly to a rapid increase of Chinese users.

First-language users among other relatively affluent countries appear generally stable, the two largest being German and Japanese, which each have between 5% and 10% of the overall share.

=== World Wide Web content ===
One widely quoted figure for the amount of web content in English is 80%. Other sources show figures five to fifteen points lower, though still well over 50%. There are two notable facts about these percentages:

The English web content is greater than the number of first-language English users by as much as 2 to 1.

Given the enormous lead it already enjoys and its increasing use as a lingua franca in other spheres, English web content may continue to dominate even as English first-language Internet users decline. This is a classic positive feedback loop: new Internet users find it helpful to learn English and employ it online, thus reinforcing the language's prestige and forcing subsequent new users to learn English as well.

Certain other factors (some predating the medium's appearance) have propelled English into a majority web-content position. Most notable in this regard is the tendency for researchers and professionals to publish in English to ensure maximum exposure. The largest database of medical bibliographical information, for example, shows English was the majority language choice for the past forty years and its share has continually increased over the same period.

The fact that non-Anglophones regularly publish in English only reinforces the language's dominance. English has a rich technical vocabulary (largely because native and non-native speakers alike use it to communicate technical ideas) and many IT and technical professionals use English regardless of country of origin (Linus Torvalds, for instance, comments his code in English, despite being from Finland and having Swedish as his first language).
