= Multilingualism =

Use of multiple languages

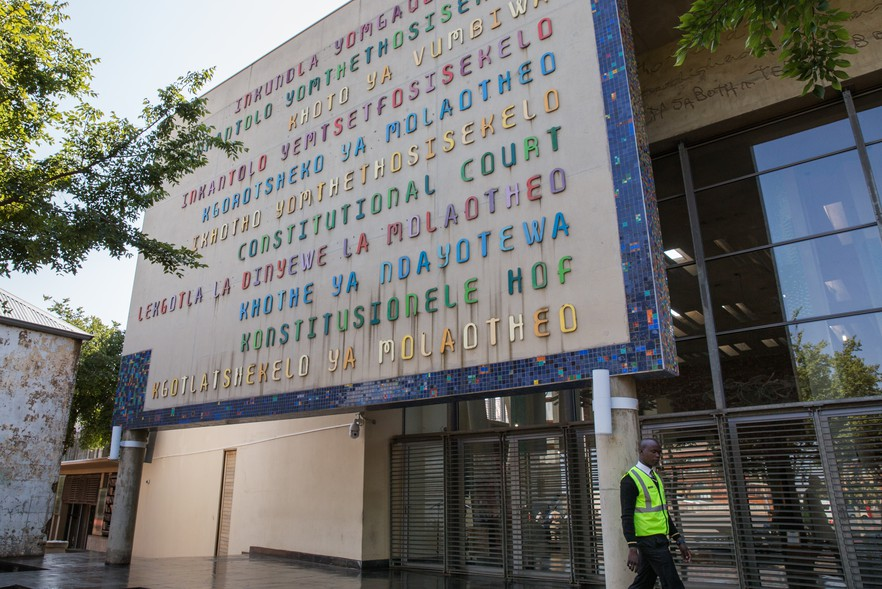
The frontage of the Constitutional Court of South Africa, with text written in eleven of South Africa's twelve official languages

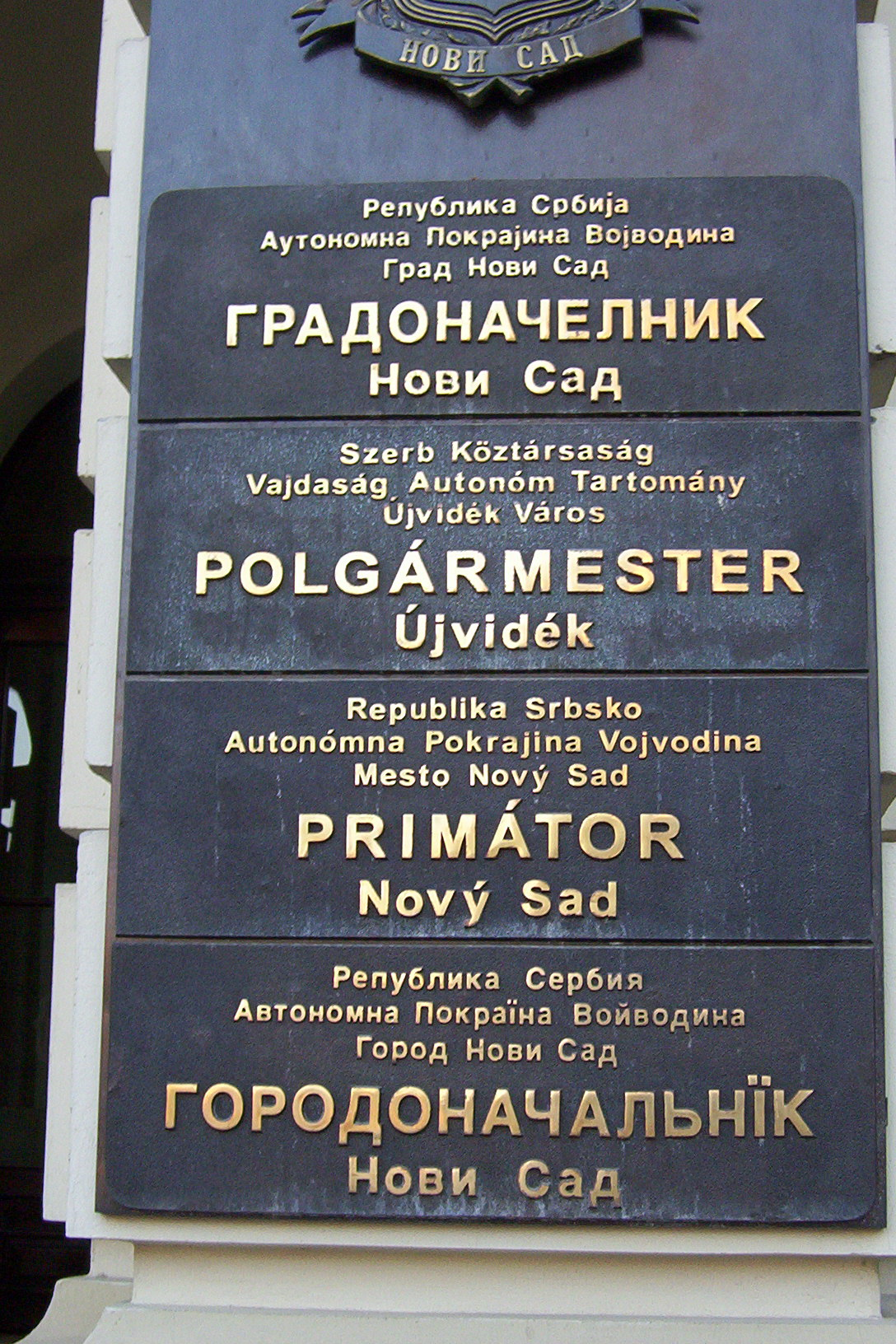
A multilingual sign outside the mayor's office in Novi Sad, Serbia, written in the four official languages of the city: Serbian, Hungarian, Slovak, and Pannonian Rusyn

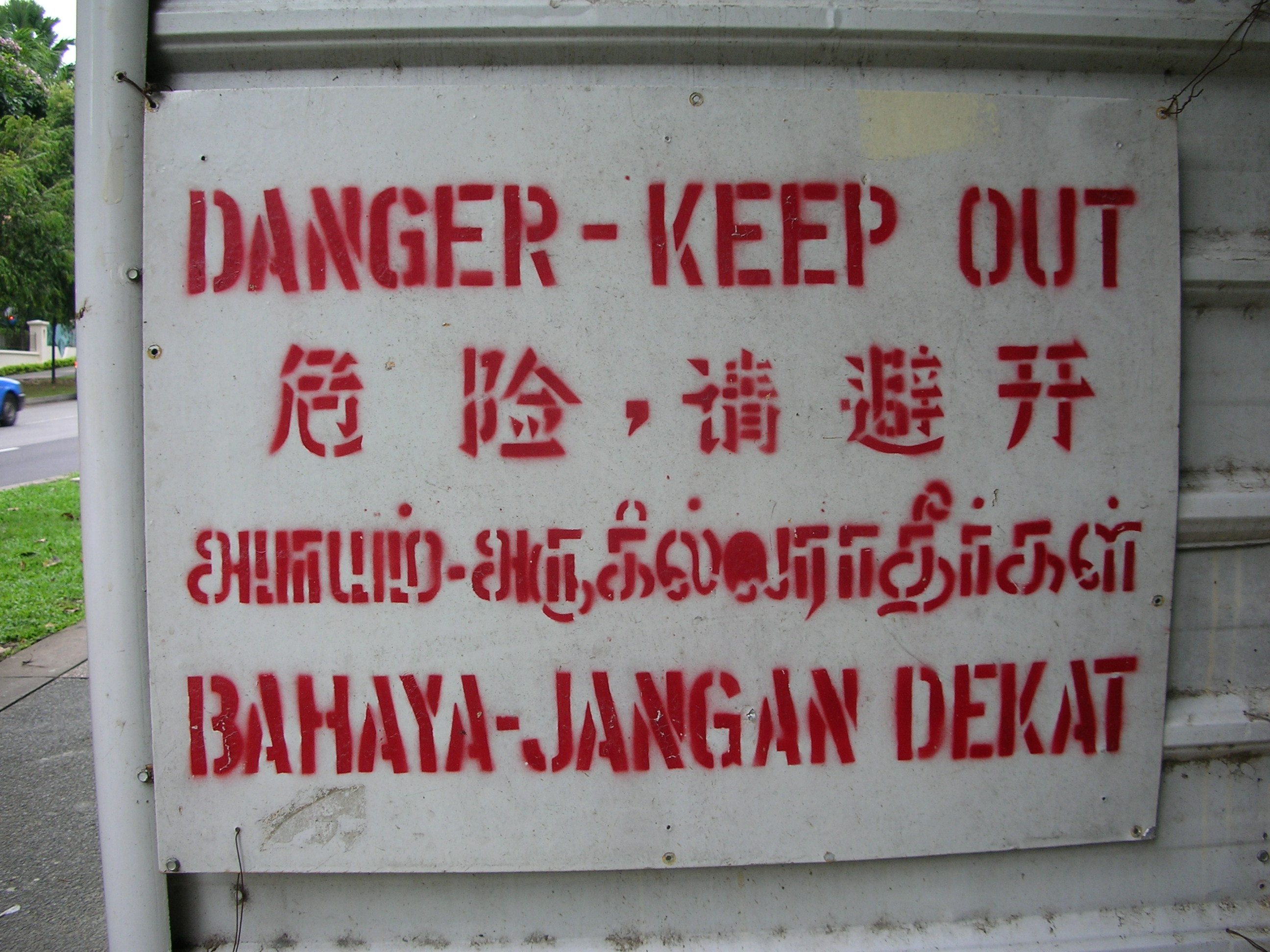
A stenciled danger sign in Singapore written in English, Mandarin, Tamil, and Malay (the four official languages of Singapore)

The logo and name of the Swiss federal administration in the four national languages of Switzerland (German, French, Italian, and Romansh)

Multilingualism is the use of more than one language, either by an individual speaker or by a group of speakers. When the languages are only two, it is usually called bilingualism. It is believed that multilingual speakers outnumber monolingual speakers in the world's population. More than half of all Europeans claim to speak at least one language other than their mother tongue, but many read and write in one language. Being multilingual is advantageous for people wanting to participate in trade, globalization and cultural openness. Owing to the ease of access to information facilitated by the Internet, individuals' exposure to multiple languages has become increasingly possible. People who speak several languages are also called polyglots.

Multilingual speakers have acquired and maintained at least one language during childhood, the so-called first language (L1). The first language (sometimes also referred to as the mother tongue) is usually acquired without formal education, by mechanisms about which scholars disagree. Children acquiring two languages natively from these early years are called simultaneous bilinguals. It is common for young simultaneous bilinguals to be more proficient in one language than the other.

People who speak more than one language have been reported to be better at language learning when compared to monolinguals.

Multilingualism in computing can be considered part of a continuum between internationalization and localization. Due to the status of English in computing, software development nearly always uses it (but not in the case of non-English-based programming languages). Some commercial software is initially available in an English version, and multilingual versions, if any, may be produced as alternative options based on the English original.

== Definition ==
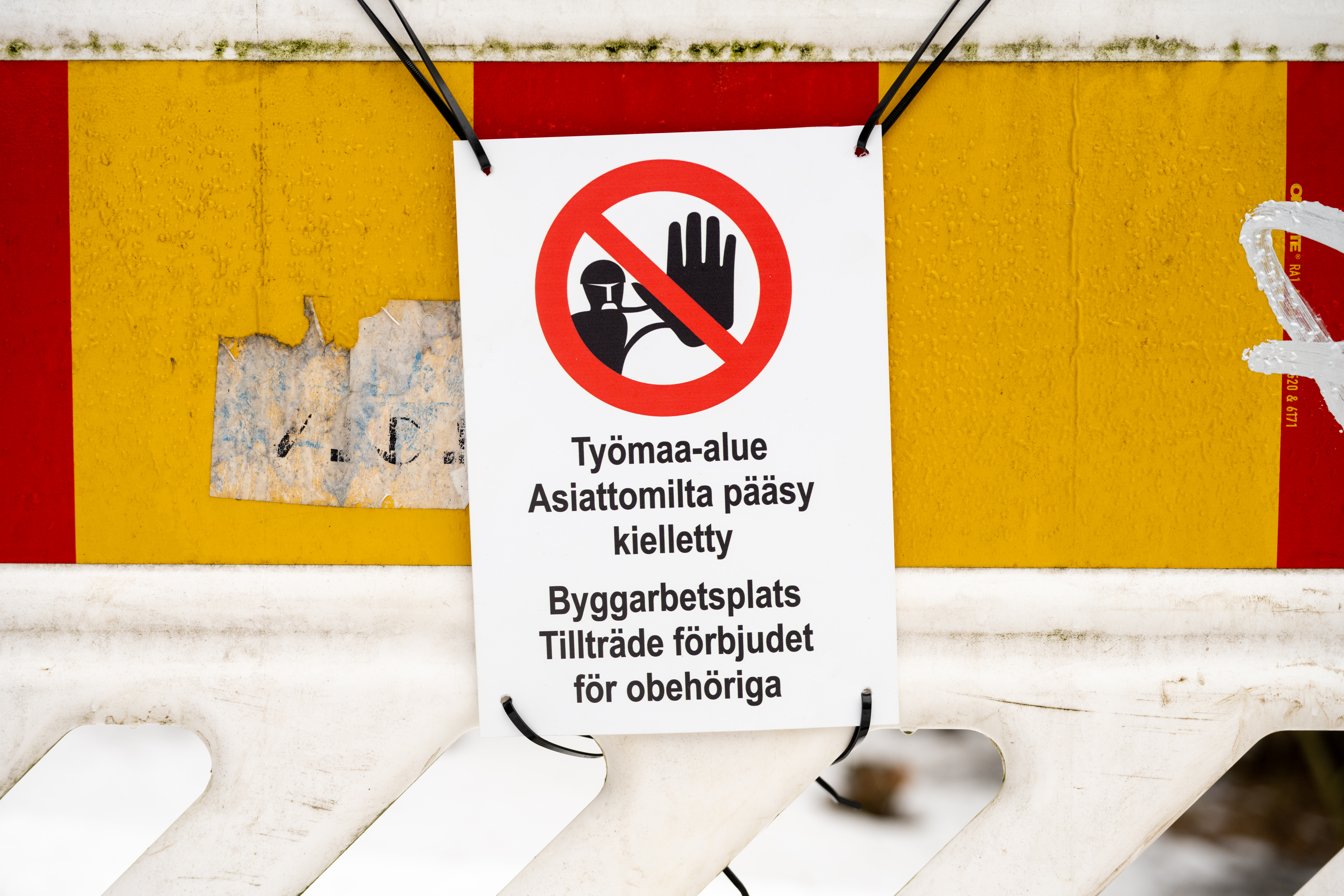
A bilingual "no trespassing" sign at a construction site in Helsinki, Finland (upper text in Finnish, lower text in Swedish)

The definition of multilingualism is a subject of debate in the same way as that of language fluency. At one end of the linguistic continuum, multilingualism may be defined as the mastery of more than one language. The speaker would have knowledge of and control over the languages equivalent to that of a native speaker. At the opposite end of the spectrum would be people who know enough phrases to get around as a tourist using the alternate language. Since 1992, Vivian Cook has argued that most multilingual speakers fall somewhere between minimal and maximal definitions. Cook calls these people multi-competent.

Modern research emphasizes that multilingualism should be viewed as a multidimensional complex term. Instead of categorizing someone as either monolingual or multilingual, multilingualism should be seen more as a multifaceted phenomenon. Someone might learn multiple languages since birth or in early childhood whereas another might not learn a second language until teenage years or even adulthood. People also differ in how well they speak a language and how often they use the different languages that they speak in everyday life.

In addition, there is no consistent definition of what constitutes a distinct language. For instance, scholars often disagree whether Scots is a language in its own right or merely a dialect of English. Furthermore, what is considered a language can change, often for purely political reasons. One example is the creation of Serbo-Croatian as a standard language on the basis of the Eastern Herzegovinian dialect to function as umbrella for numerous South Slavic dialects; after the breakup of Yugoslavia, it was split into Serbian, Croatian, Bosnian and Montenegrin. Another example is the historical dismissal of Ukrainian as a Russian dialect by the Russian tsars to discourage national feelings. Many small independent nations' schoolchildren are today compelled to learn multiple languages because of international interactions. For example, in Finland, all children are required to learn at least three languages: the two national languages (Finnish and Swedish) and one foreign language (usually English). Many Finnish schoolchildren also study further languages, such as German, French or Spanish.

In some large nations with multiple languages, such as India, schoolchildren may routinely learn multiple languages based on where they reside in the country.

In many countries, bilingualism occurs through international relations, which, with English being a global lingua franca, sometimes results in majority bilingualism even when the countries in question have just one domestic official language. This occurs especially in regions such as Scandinavia and the Benelux, as well as among Germanophones, but the phenomenon has also been expanding into some non-Germanic countries.

== History ==
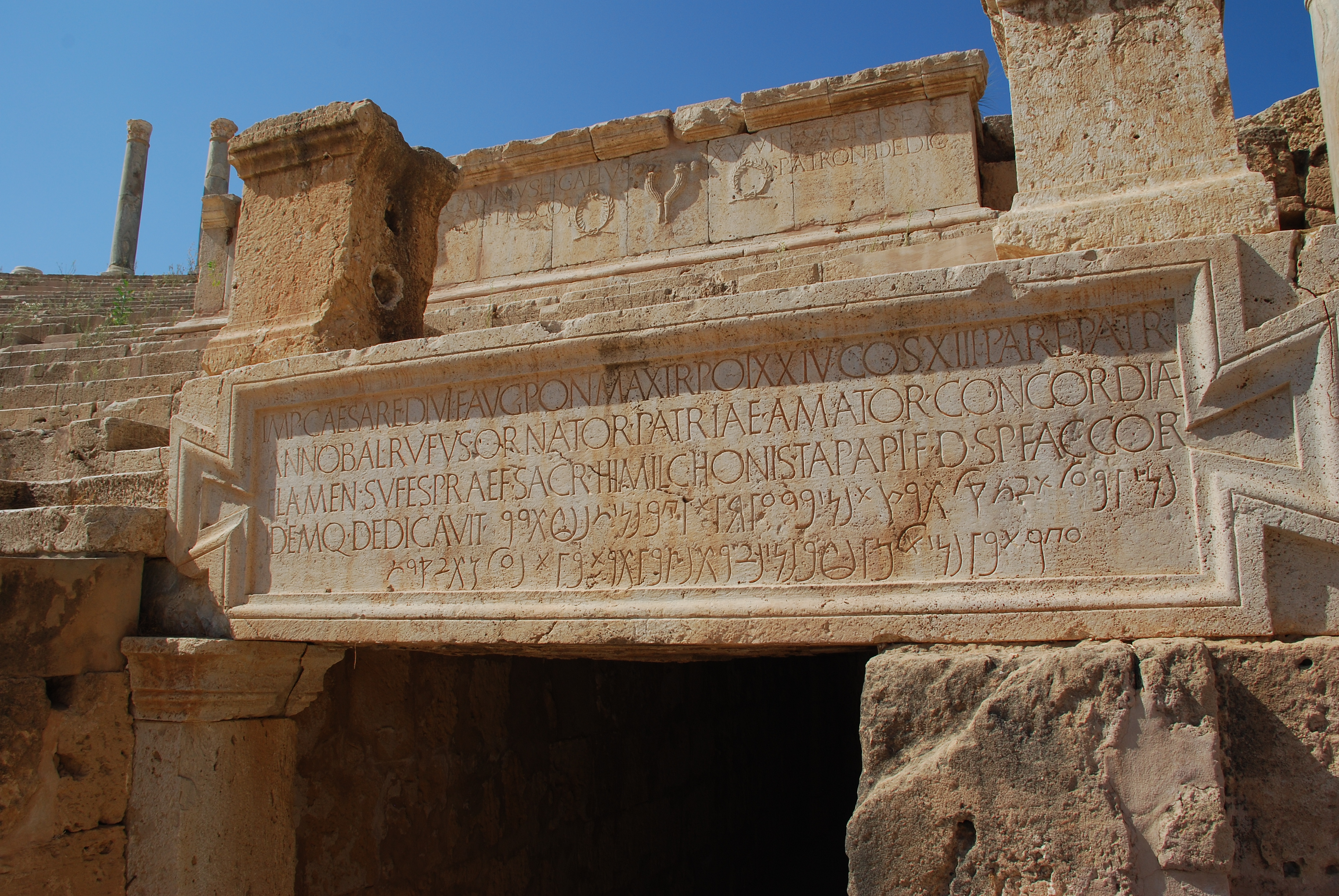
One of the Tripolitania Punic inscriptions at Leptis Magna, written in both Latin (top) and Punic (bottom)

The first recorded use of the word multilingual in the English language occurred in the 1830s. The word is a combination of multi- ("many") and -lingual ("pertaining to languages"). The phenomenon of multilingualism is as old as the very existence of different languages.

Today, evidence of multilingualism in an area includes things such as bilingual signs, which represent the same message in more than one language. Historical examples include glosses in textual sources, which can provide notes in a different language from the source text; macaronic texts which mix together two or more languages with the expectation that the reader will understand both; the existence of separate sacred and vernacular languages (such as Church Latin vs. common forms of Latin, and Hebrew vs. Aramaic and Jewish languages); and the frequency of linguistic borrowings and other results of language contact.

== Motivation ==
=== Economic benefits ===
Bilinguals might have important labor market advantages over monolingual individuals as bilingual people can carry out duties that monolinguals cannot, such as interacting with customers who only speak a minority language. A study in Switzerland has found that multilingualism is positively correlated with an individual's salary, the productivity of firms, and the gross domestic production (GDP); the authors state that Switzerland's GDP is augmented by 10% by multilingualism. A study in the United States by O. Agirdag found that bilingualism has substantial economic benefits, as bilingual people were found to earn around $3,000 more per year in salary than monolinguals.

== Acquisition ==
One view is that of the linguist Noam Chomsky in what he calls the human language acquisition device—a mechanism that enables a learner to recreate correctly the rules and certain other characteristics of language used by surrounding speakers. This device, according to Chomsky, wears out over time, and is not normally available by puberty, which he uses to explain the poor results some adolescents and adults have when learning aspects of a second language (L2).

If language learning is a cognitive process, rather than a language acquisition device, as the school led by Stephen Krashen suggests, there would only be relative, not categorical, differences between the two types of language learning.

Rod Ellis quotes that the earlier children learn a second language, the better off they are, in terms of pronunciation. (Note: See the critical period hypothesis.)

European schools generally offer secondary language classes for their students early on, due to the interconnectedness among neighboring countries with different languages. Most European students now study at least two foreign languages, a process strongly encouraged by the European Union.

In second language class, students commonly face difficulties in thinking in the target language because they are influenced by their native language and cultural patterns. Robert B. Kaplan believes that in second language classes, foreign students' papers may seem out of focus because the foreign student employs rhetoric and sequences of thought that violate the expectations of the native reader. Foreign students who have mastered syntactic structures have still demonstrated an inability to compose adequate themes, term papers, theses, and dissertations. Robert B. Kaplan describes two key words that affect people when they learn a second language. Logic in the popular, rather than the logician's sense of the word, is the basis of rhetoric, evolved out of a culture; it is not universal. Rhetoric, then, is not universal either, but varies from culture to culture and even from time to time within a given culture. Language teachers know how to predict the differences between pronunciations or constructions in different languages, but they might be less clear about the differences between rhetoric, that is, in the way they use language to accomplish various purposes, particularly in writing.

People who learn multiple languages may also experience positive transfer – the process by which it becomes easier to learn additional languages if the grammar or vocabulary of the new language is similar to those of the languages already spoken. On the other hand, students may also experience negative transfer – interference from languages learned at an earlier stage of development while learning a new language later in life.

Translanguaging also supports the acquisition of new languages. It helps the development of new languages by forming connections from one language to another.

=== Receptive bilingualism ===
Receptive bilinguals are those who can understand a second language but who cannot speak it or whose abilities to speak it are inhibited by psychological barriers.

Receptive bilingualism is frequently encountered among adult immigrants to the U.S. who do not speak English as a native language but who have children who do speak English natively, usually in part because those children's education has been conducted in English. While the immigrant parents can understand both their native language and English, they speak only their native language to their children. If their children are likewise receptively bilingual but productively English-monolingual, throughout the conversation the parents will speak their native language and the children will speak English. If their children are productively bilingual, however, those children may answer in their parents' native language, in English, or in a combination of both languages, varying their choice of language depending on factors such as the communication's content, context or emotional intensity and the presence or absence of third-party speakers of one language or the other. The third alternative represents the phenomenon of "code-switching" in which the productively bilingual party to a communication switches languages in the course of that communication.

Receptively bilingual persons, especially children, may rapidly achieve oral fluency by spending extended time in situations where they are required to speak the language that they theretofore understood only passively.

Until both generations achieve oral fluency, not all definitions of bilingualism accurately characterize the family as a whole, but the linguistic differences between the family's generations often constitute little or no impairment to the family's functionality.

Receptive bilingualism in one language as exhibited by a speaker of another language, or even as exhibited by most speakers of that language, is not the same as mutual intelligibility of languages; the latter is a property of a pair of languages, namely a consequence of objectively high lexical and grammatical similarities between the languages themselves (e.g., Norwegian and Swedish), whereas the former is a property of one or more persons and is determined by subjective or intersubjective factors such as the respective languages' prevalence in the life history (including family upbringing, educational setting, and ambient culture) of the person or persons.

=== Order of acquisition ===
In sequential bilingualism, learners receive literacy instruction in their native language until they acquire a "threshold" literacy proficiency. Some researchers use age three as the age when a child has basic communicative competence in their first language (Kessler, 1984). Children may go through a process of sequential acquisition if they migrate at a young age to a country where a different language is spoken, or if the child exclusively speaks their heritage language at home until they are immersed in a school setting where instruction is offered in a different language.

Based on the research in Ann Fathman's The Relationship Between Age and Second Language Productive Ability, there is a difference in the rate of learning of English morphology, syntax and phonology based upon differences in age, but the order of acquisition in second language learning does not change with age.

In simultaneous bilingualism, the native language and the community language are simultaneously taught. The advantage is literacy in two languages as the outcome. However, the teacher must be well-versed in both languages and also in techniques for teaching a second language.

The phases children go through during sequential acquisition are less linear than for simultaneous acquisition and can vary greatly among children. Sequential acquisition is a more complex and lengthier process, although there is no indication that non-language-delayed children end up less proficient than simultaneous bilinguals, so long as they receive adequate input in both languages.

A coordinate model posits that equal time should be spent in separate instruction of the native language and the community language. The native language class, however, focuses on basic literacy while the community language class focuses on listening and speaking skills. Being bilingual does not necessarily mean that one can speak, for example, English and French.

==== Outcomes ====
Research has found that the development of competence in the native language serves as a foundation of proficiency that can be transposed to the second language – the common underlying proficiency hypothesis. Cummins' work sought to overcome the perception propagated in the 1960s that learning two languages made for two competing aims. The belief was that the two languages were mutually exclusive and that learning a second required unlearning elements and dynamics of the first to accommodate the second. The evidence for this perspective relied on the fact that some errors in acquiring the second language were related to the rules of the first language.

Another new development that has influenced the linguistic argument for bilingual literacy is the length of time necessary to acquire a second language. Previously, children were believed to have the ability to learn a language within a year, but today, researchers believe that within and across academic settings, the period is closer to five years.

An interesting outcome of studies during the early 1990s, however, confirmed that students who do complete bilingual instruction perform better academically. These students exhibit more cognitive flexibility, including a better ability to analyze abstract visual patterns. Students who receive two-way bilingual immersion, a form of dual language education that brings together students from two different language backgrounds to learn in both languages, will perform at an even higher level. Examples of such programs include international and multi-national education schools.

=== Non-Native Bilingualism ===
Non-native bilingualism (NNB; also referred to as “non-native bilingual parenting”) describes the practice of parents speaking to their child in a second or non-native language (often an L2) that is not the predominant language of the child's environment.

Although raising children in a language other than the parents' native language is controversial and is considered by some authors to be potentially harmful to the child, this practice has become popular in some predominantly monolingual countries in Central and Eastern Europe (e.g., Poland) and in Korea. Studies have shown that deaf children can acquire sign language at a native-like level through exposure to their environment, even when their parents are hearing and do not speak sign language as their native language. These findings are cited as evidence that even non-native speakers can raise children who achieve near-native proficiency in a language. A 2026 review found that, across numerous studies, children's proficiency in both languages reached levels comparable to those of other bilingual or monolingual children. Studies examining language proficiency generally conclude that the language used in the wider social environment tends to dominate over the non-social language.

However, a study involving 42 children with autism found that the children responded less frequently and less synchronously to their parents when the parents spoke to them in a foreign language. At first glance, this finding suggests potential difficulties for the children. However, the authors emphasize that further research is needed to investigate this issue.

Before 1980, only one academic publication had addressed the practice of raising children in a non-native language. Since then, the number of publications has increased sharply. Overall, research on bilingualism among non-native speakers remains limited. A literature review is provided by Szramek-Karcz (2016). A comprehensive review of the literature is also available in a master's thesis from the University of Vienna.

Several case studies have been published in the academic literature:

- One case study describes a 5-year-old child in Turkey who was raised in English by his Turkish-speaking father. The findings suggest that even relatively limited exposure to a second, non-native language can lead to its acquisition, provided that parents consistently use only the chosen language and avoid mixing languages.
- Another account of a successful case, published in the academic literature, concerns a Chinese family. Drawing on Cummins' threshold hypothesis, the author concludes that non-native bilingualism has no adverse cognitive effects, provided that the child achieves at least native-like proficiency in one of the languages.

== In individuals ==
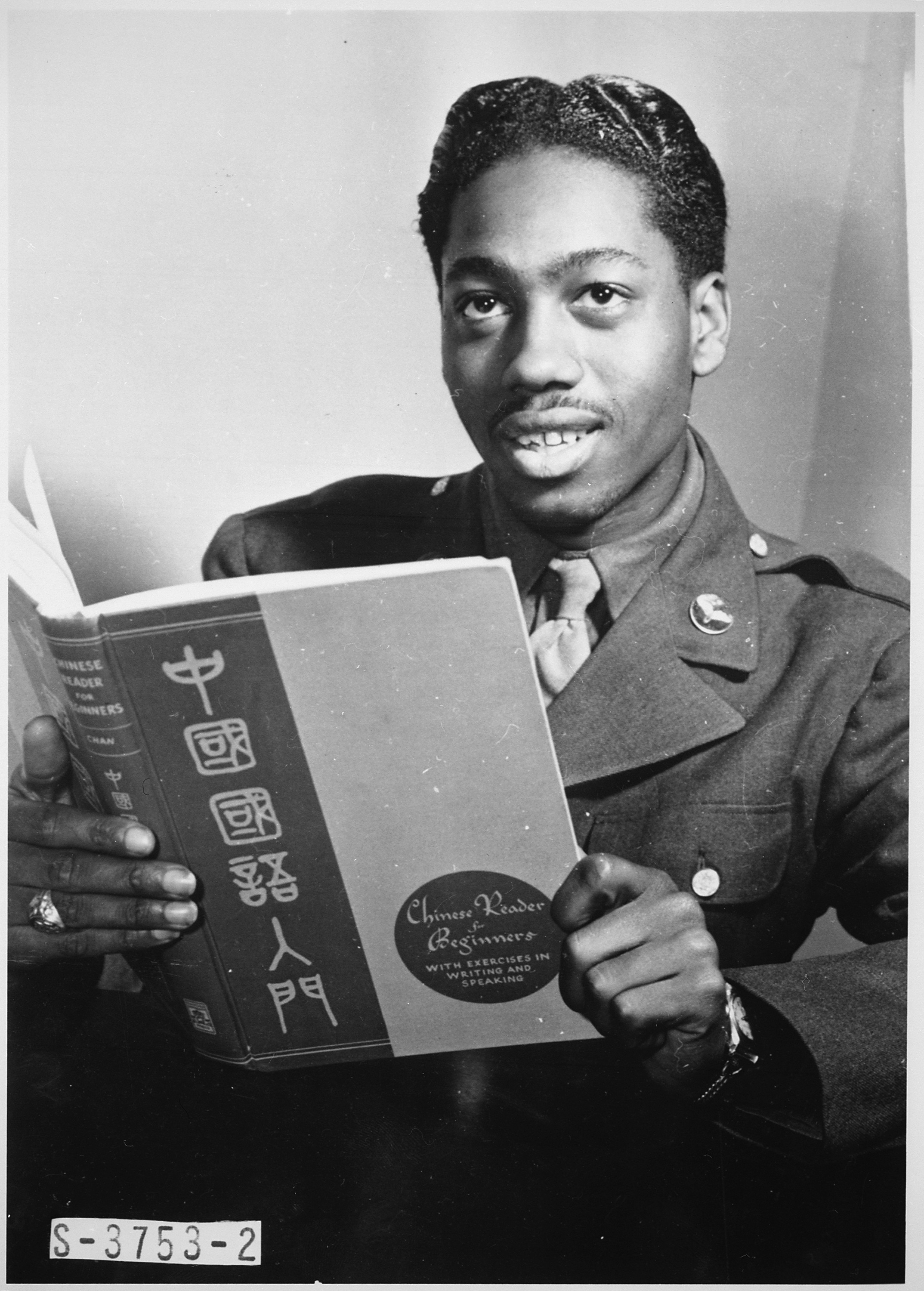
"Pvt. Lloyd A. Taylor, 21-year-old transportation dispatcher at Mitchel Field, New York City, who knows Latin, Greek, Spanish, French, German, and Japanese, studies a book on Chinese. A former medical student at Temple University, he passes two hours a day studying languages as a hobby." This picture was taken during World War II.

A multilingual person is someone who can communicate in more than one language actively (through speaking, writing, or signing). Multilingual people can logically speak any language they write in (aside from mute multilingual people), but they cannot necessarily write in any language they speak. More specifically, bilingual and trilingual people are those in comparable situations involving two or three languages, respectively. A multilingual person is generally referred to as a polyglot, a term that may also refer to people who learn multiple languages as a hobby. Multilingual speakers have acquired and maintained at least one language during childhood, the so-called first language (L1). The first language (sometimes also referred to as the mother tongue) is acquired without formal education, by mechanisms heavily disputed. Children acquiring two languages in this way are called simultaneous bilinguals. Even in the case of simultaneous bilinguals, one language usually dominates over the other.

In linguistics, first language acquisition is closely related to the concept of a "native speaker". According to a view widely held by linguists, a native speaker of a given language has in some respects a level of skill that a second (or subsequent) language learner cannot easily accomplish. Consequently, descriptive empirical studies of languages are usually carried out using only native speakers. This view is, however, slightly problematic, particularly as many non-native speakers demonstrably not only successfully engage with and in their non-native language societies, but in fact may become culturally and even linguistically important contributors (as, for example, writers, politicians, media personalities and performing artists) in their non-native language. In recent years, linguistic research has focused attention on the use of widely known world languages, such as English, as a lingua franca or a shared common language of professional and commercial communities. In lingua franca situations, most speakers of the common language are functionally multilingual.

The reverse phenomenon, where people who know more than one language end up losing command of some or all of their additional languages, is called language attrition. It has been documented that, under certain conditions, individuals may lose their L1 language proficiency completely, after switching to the exclusive use of another language, and effectively "become native" in a language that was once secondary after the L1 undergoes total attrition.

This is most commonly seen among immigrant communities. The most important factor in spontaneous, total L1 loss appears to be age; in the absence of neurological dysfunction or injury, only young children typically are at risk of forgetting their native language and switching to a new one. Once they pass an age that seems to correlate closely with the critical period, around the age of 12, total loss of a native language is not typical, although it is still possible for speakers to experience diminished expressive capacity if the language is never practiced.

=== Cognitive ability ===
There is no evidence for a bilingual advantage in executive function and lexical difficulties are confined to those who learnt a second language later in life. Some initial reports concluded that people who use more than one language have been reported to be more adept at language learning compared to monolinguals, and this idea persisted in part due to publication bias. Current meta-analyses find no effect.

Individuals who are highly proficient in two or more languages have been reported to have a certain very marginally enhanced or no different executive function, and older onset for dementia. More recently, however, this claim has come under strong criticism with repeated failures to replicate. Yet, many prior studies do not reliably quantify samples of bilinguals under investigation. An emerging perspective is that studies on bilingual and multilingual cognitive abilities need to account for validated and granular quantifications of language experience in order to identify boundary conditions of possible cognitive effects.

=== Auditory ability ===
Bilingual and multilingual individuals are shown to have superior auditory processing abilities compared to monolingual individuals. Several investigations have compared auditory processing abilities of monolingual and bilingual individuals using tasks such as gap detection, temporal ordering, pitch pattern recognition etc. In general, results of studies have reported superior performance among bilingual and multilingual individuals. Furthermore, among bilingual individuals, one's level of proficiency in one's second language was also reported to influence auditory processing abilities.

=== Psychology ===
A study in 2012 has shown that using a foreign language reduces decision-making biases. It was surmised that the framing effect disappeared when choices are presented in a second language. As human reasoning is shaped by two distinct modes of thought: one that is systematic, analytical and cognition-intensive, and another that is fast, unconscious and emotionally charged, it was believed that a second language provides a useful cognitive distance from automatic processes, promoting analytical thought and reducing unthinking, emotional reaction. Therefore, those who speak two languages have better critical thinking and decision-making skills. A study published a year later found that switching to a second language seems to exempt bilinguals from social norms and constraints, such as political correctness. In 2014, another study showed that people using a foreign language are more likely to make utilitarian decisions when faced with moral dilemmas, such as the trolley problem and its variations. Participants in this study chose the utilitarian option more often in the Fat Man dilemma when it was presented in a foreign language. For the related Switch Track dilemma, however, the use of a foreign language presented no significant influence on the choices participants made. The authors of this study surmised that a foreign language lacks the emotional impact of one's native language.

=== Personality ===
Because it is difficult or impossible to master many of the high-level semantic aspects of a language (including but not limited to its idioms and eponyms) without first understanding the culture and history of the region in which that language evolved, as a practical matter an in-depth familiarity with multiple cultures is a prerequisite for high-level multilingualism. This knowledge of multiple cultures, both individually and comparatively, can shape an individual's sense of identity and how others perceive it. Some studies have found that groups of multilingual individuals get higher average scores on tests for certain personality traits such as cultural empathy, open-mindedness and social initiative. The idea of linguistic relativity, which claims that the language people speak influences the way they see the world, can be interpreted to mean that individuals who speak multiple languages have a broader, more diverse view of the world, even when speaking only one language at a time. Some bilinguals feel that their personality changes depending on which language they are speaking; thus multilingualism is said to create multiple personalities. Xiao-lei Wang states in her book Growing up with Three Languages: Birth to Eleven: "Languages used by speakers with one or more than one language are used not just to represent a unitary self, but to enact different kinds of selves, and different linguistic contexts create different kinds of self-expression and experiences for the same person." However, there has been little rigorous research done on this topic and it is difficult to define "personality" in this context. François Grosjean wrote: "What is seen as a change in personality is most probably simply a shift in attitudes and behaviors that correspond to a shift in situation or context, independent of language." However, the Sapir–Whorf hypothesis, which states that a language shapes our vision of the world, may suggest that a language learned by an adult may have much fewer emotional connotations and therefore allow a more serene discussion than a language learned by a child and to that respect more or less bound to a child's perception of the world.

=== Hyperpolyglots and savants ===
Many polyglots know up to five or six languages, but the frequency of polyglotism drops off sharply past this point. Those who know more languages than five or six—Michael Erard suggests eleven or more, while Usman W. Chohan suggests six to eight (depending on proficiency) or more—are sometimes classed as hyperpolyglots. Giuseppe Caspar Mezzofanti, for example, was an Italian priest reputed to have spoken anywhere from 30 to 72 languages.

The term savant, in a general sense, may refer to any individual with a natural or innate talent for a particular field; however, people diagnosed with savant syndrome are specifically individuals with significant mental disabilities who demonstrate certain profound and prodigious capacities or certain abilities far in excess of what would usually be considered normal, occasionally including a prodigious capacity for languages. Savant syndrome is almost always associated with an increased memory capacity of some sort, which can, for certain savants, aid in storing and retrieving knowledge of different languages. In 1991, for example, linguists Neil Smith and Ianthi-Maria Tsimpli described a man, named Christopher, who learned sixteen languages even with a non-verbal IQ between 40 and 70. Christopher was born in 1962, and he was diagnosed with brain damage approximately six months after his birth. Despite being institutionalized because he was unable to take care of himself, Christopher had a verbal IQ of 89, could speak English with no impairment, and could learn subsequent languages with apparent ease. This facility with language and communication is considered to be unusual for most diagnosed with savant syndrome.

== Neuroscience ==
Neuroscience of multilingualism is the study of multilingualism within the field of neurology. These studies include the representation of different language systems in the brain, the effects of multilingualism on the brain's structural plasticity, aphasia in multilingual individuals, and bimodal bilinguals (people who can speak at least one sign language and at least one oral language). Neurological studies of multilingualism are carried out with functional neuroimaging, electrophysiology, and through observation of people who have suffered brain damage.

The brain contains areas that are specialized to deal with language, located in the perisylvian cortex of the left hemisphere. These areas are crucial for performing language tasks, but they are not the only areas that are used; disparate parts of both the right and left brain hemispheres are active during language production. In multilingual individuals, there is a great deal of similarity in the brain areas used for each of their languages. Insights into the neurology of multilingualism have been gained by the study of multilingual individuals with aphasia, or the loss of one or more languages as a result of brain damage. Bilingual aphasics can show several different patterns of recovery; they may recover one language but not another, they may recover both languages simultaneously, or they may involuntarily mix different languages during language production during the recovery period. These patterns are explained by the dynamic view of bilingual aphasia, which holds that the language system of representation and control is compromised as a result of brain damage.

Research has also been carried out into the neurology of bimodal bilinguals, or people who can speak at least one oral language and at least one sign language. Studies with bimodal bilinguals have also provided insight into the tip of the tongue phenomenon, working memory, and patterns of neural activity when recognizing facial expressions, signing, and speaking.

== In communities ==
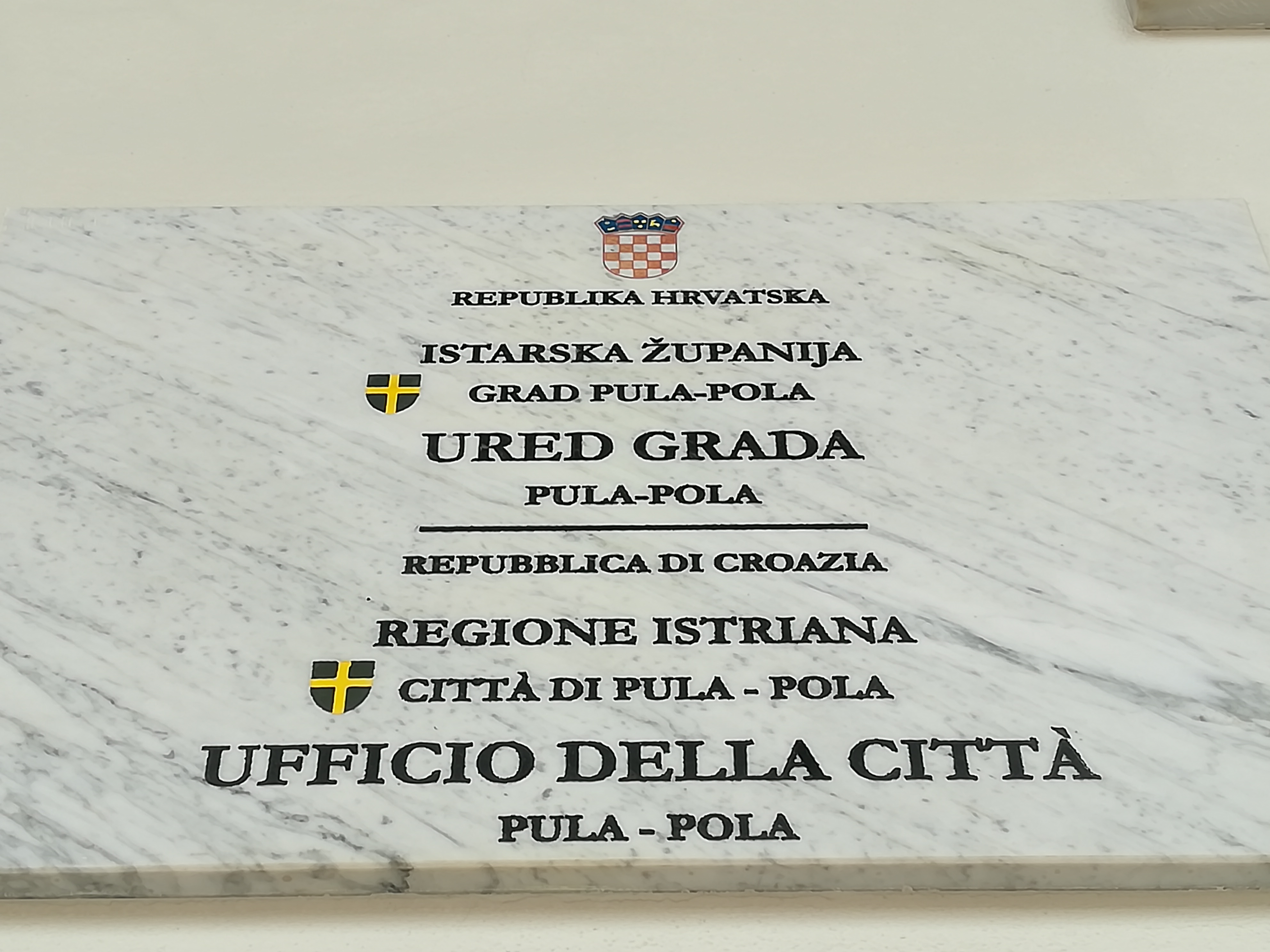
Croatian-Italian bilingual plate on a public building in Pula/Pola (Istria)

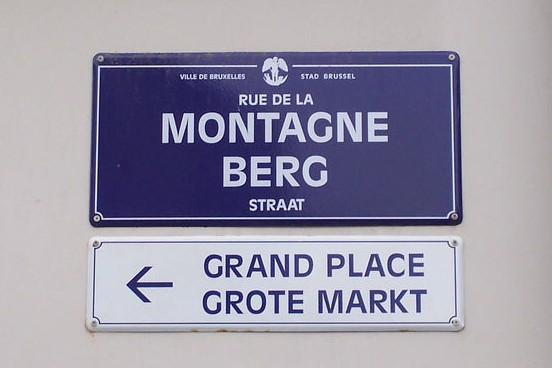
A bilingual sign in Brussels, the capital of Belgium. In Brussels, both Dutch and French are official languages.

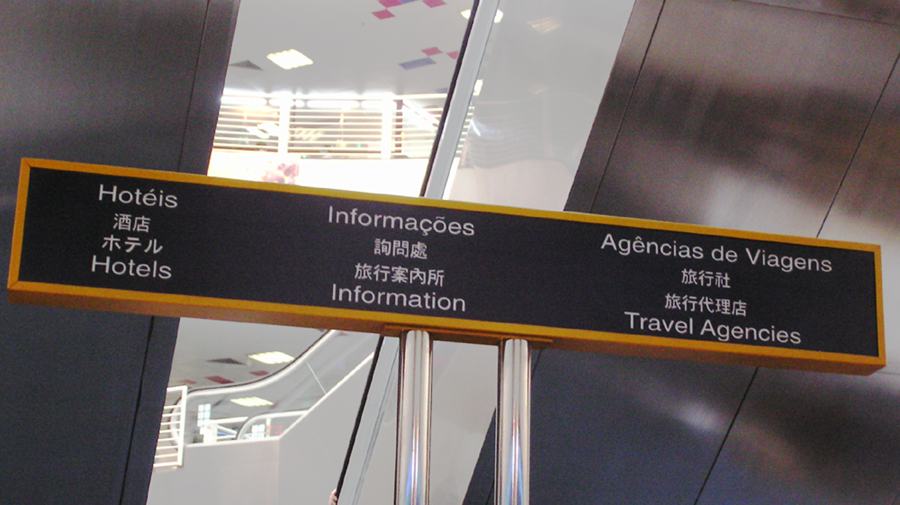
A multilingual sign at the Hong Kong-Macau Ferry Pier in Macau. At the top are Portuguese and Chinese, which are the official languages of Macau, while at the bottom are Japanese and English, which are common languages used by tourists (English is also one of Hong Kong's two official languages).

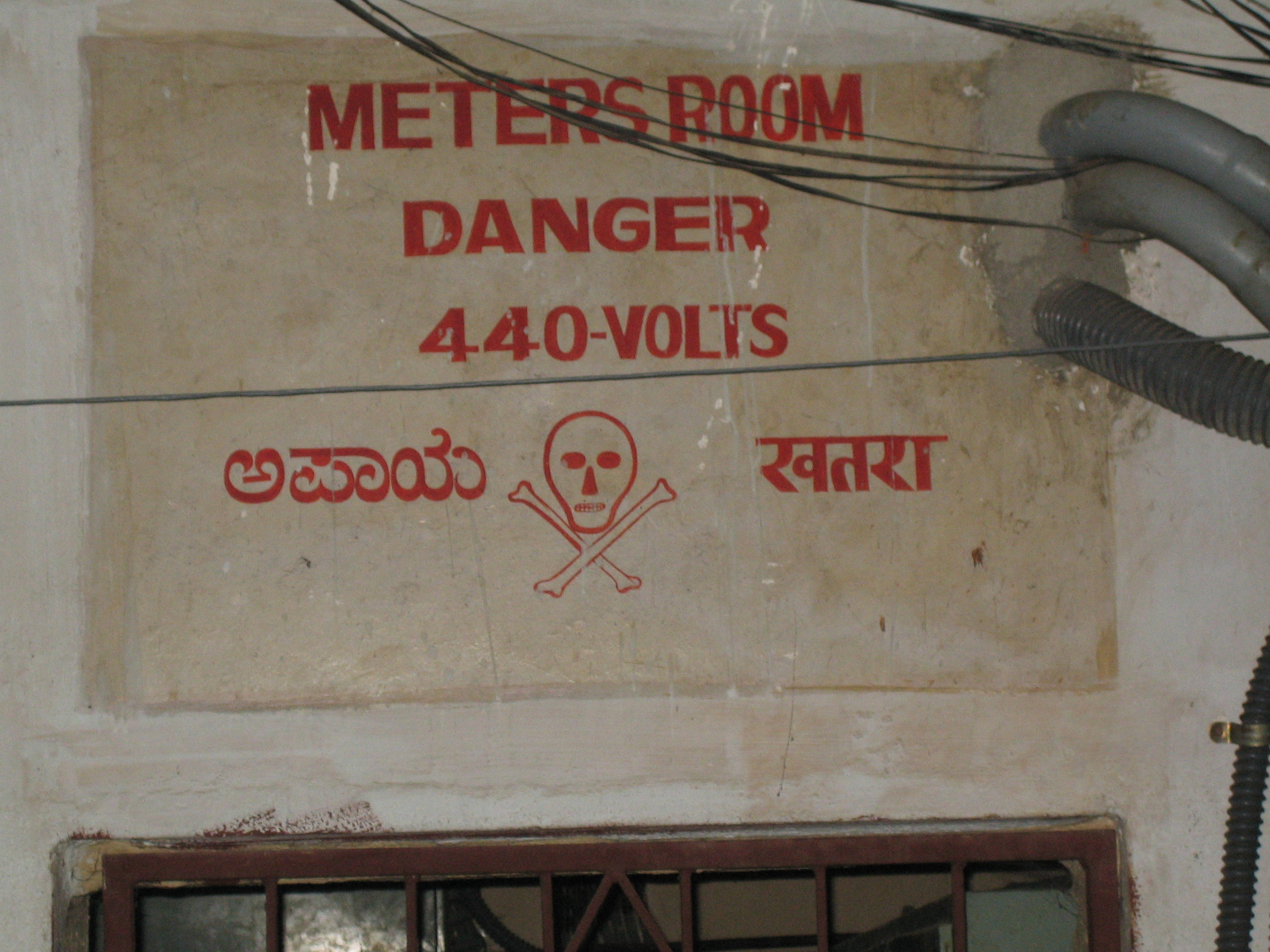
A caution message in English, Kannada and Hindi found in Bangalore, India

The three-language (Tamil, English and Hindi) name board at the Tirusulam suburban railway station in Chennai (Madras). Almost all railway stations in India have signs like these in three or more languages (English, Hindi and the local language(s)).

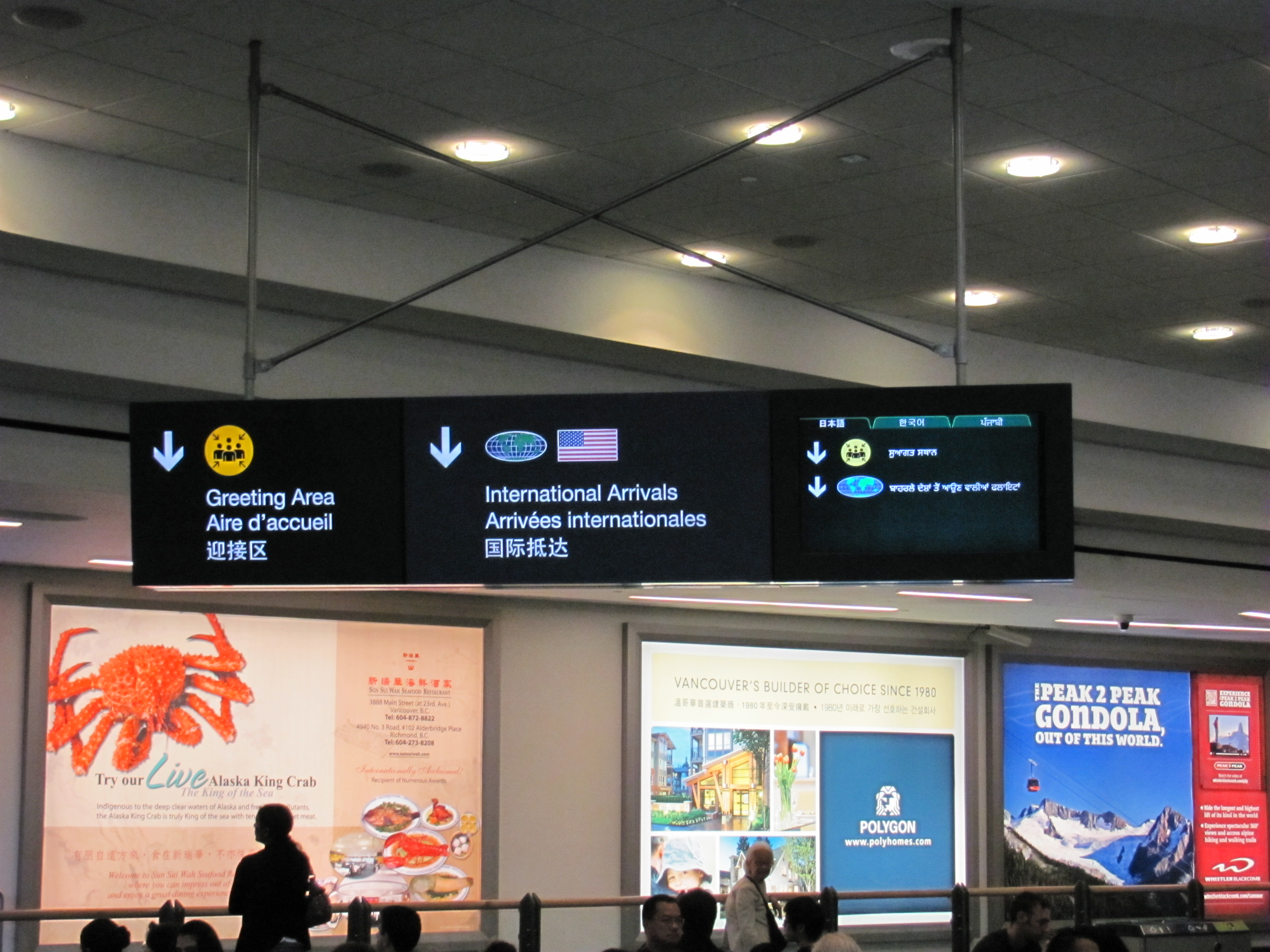
Multilingual sign at Vancouver International Airport, international arrivals area. Text in English, French, and Chinese is a permanent feature of this sign, while the right panel of the sign is a video screen that rotates through additional languages.

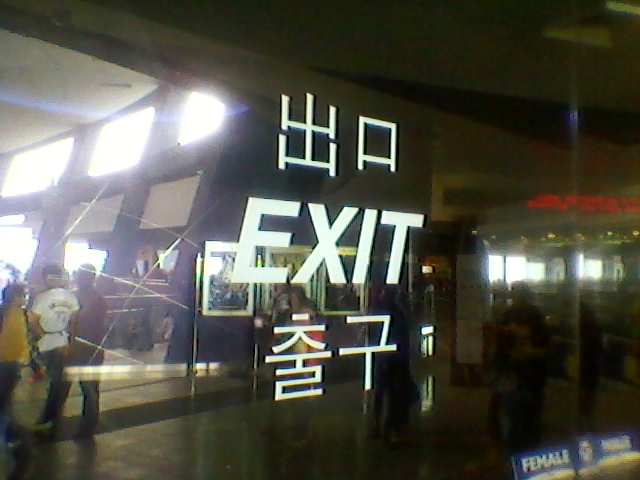
Multilingual sign at an exit of SM Mall of Asia in Pasay, Philippines. Three or four languages are shown: Japanese/Mandarin Chinese ("deguchi" or "chūkǒu", respectively), English ("exit") and Korean ("chulgu"). While Filipinos themselves are anglophones, such signs cater to the growing number of Koreans and other foreigners in the country.

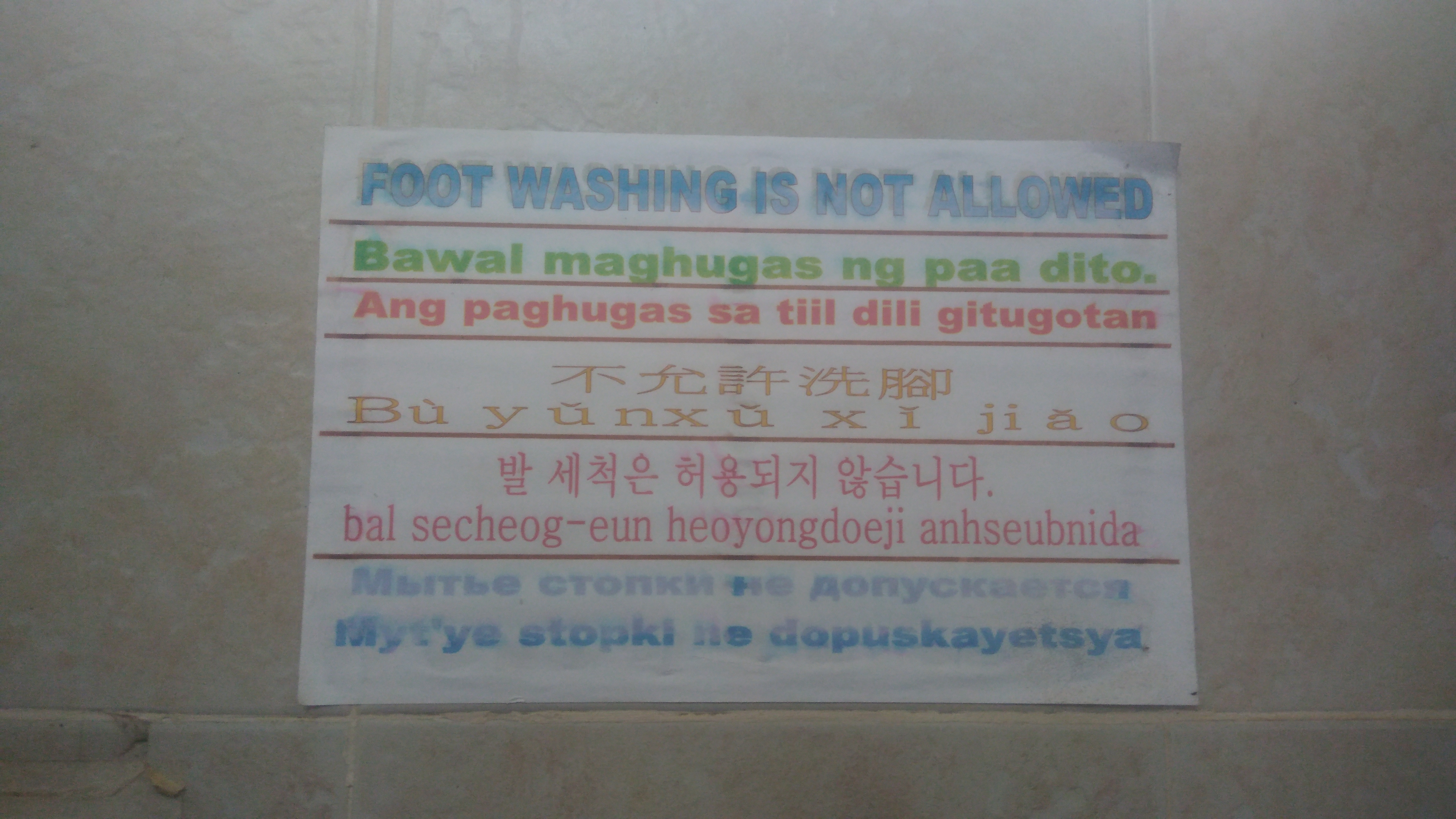
Multilingual message at a public toilet in Puerto Princesa, Palawan, Philippines that prohibits foot washing. Text is written in six languages: English, Filipino, Cebuano, Chinese, Korean, and Russian, from top to bottom.

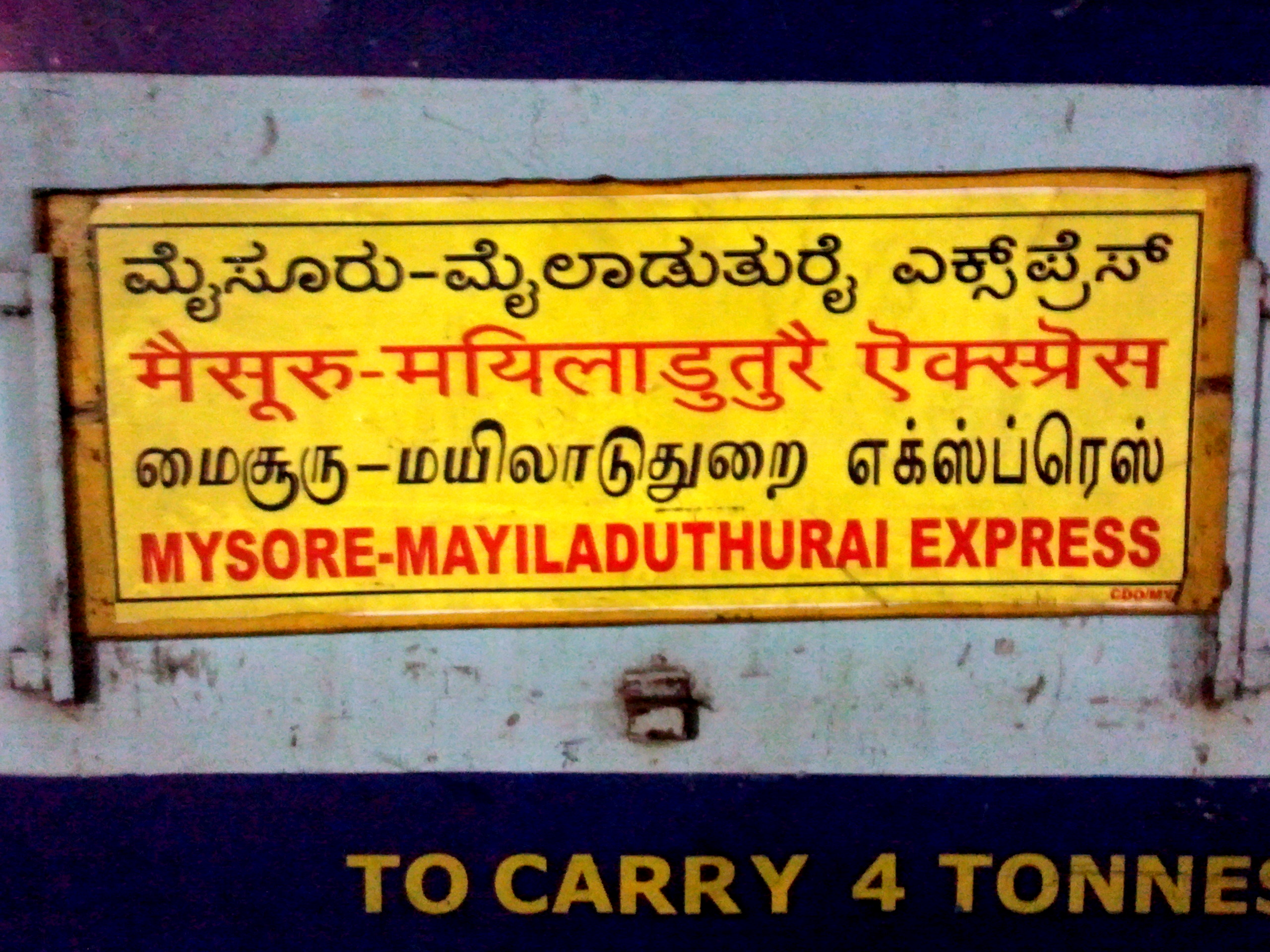
The name of a train found in South India written in four languages: Kannada, Hindi, Tamil, and English. Boards like this are common on trains that pass through two or more states where the languages spoken are different.

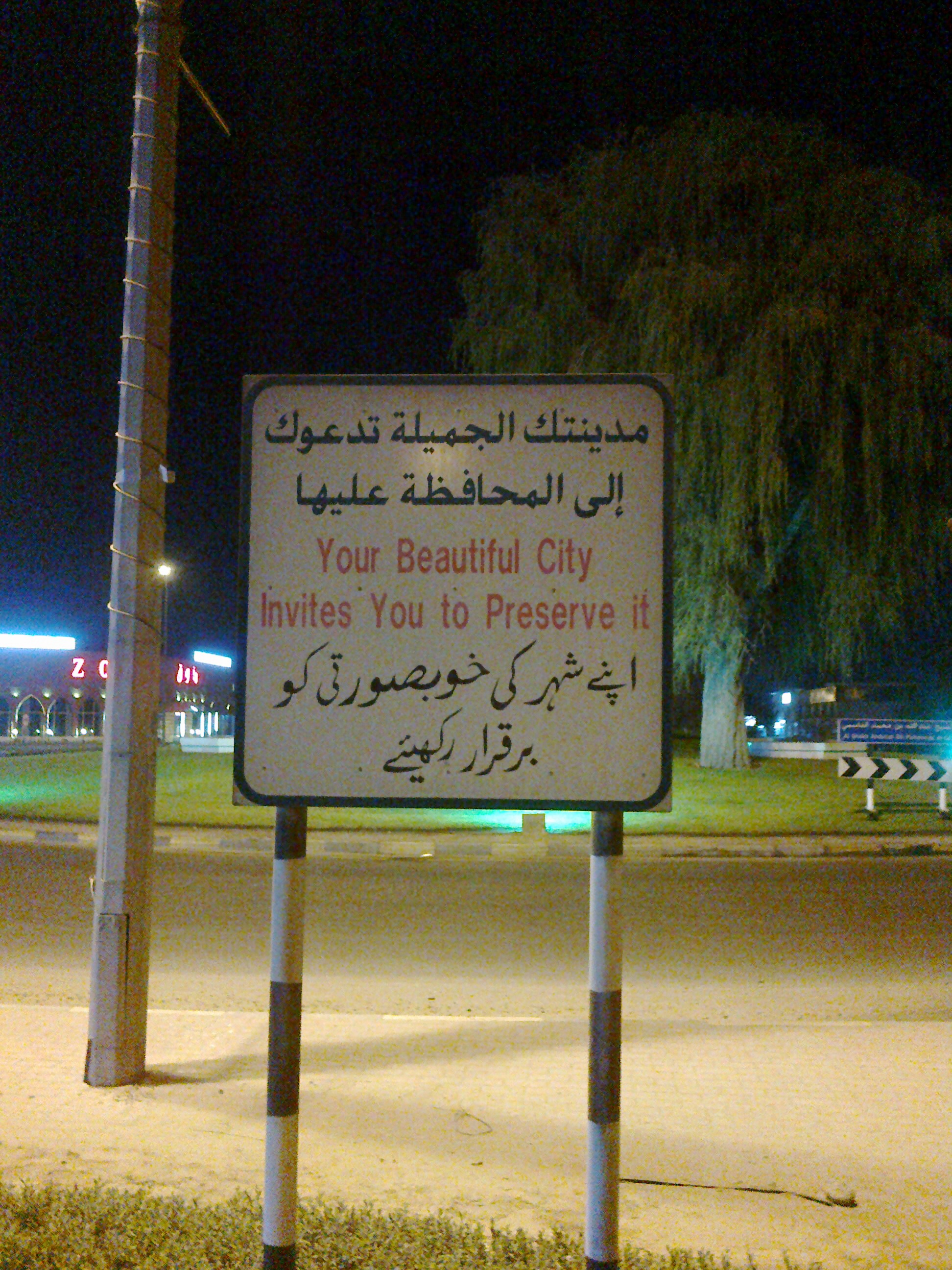
A trilingual (Arabic, English and Urdu) sign in the UAE in the three widely spoken languages in the UAE

Widespread multilingualism is one form of language contact. Multilingualism was common in the past: in early times, when most people were members of small language communities, it was necessary to know two or more languages for trade or any other dealings outside one's town or village, and this holds good today in places of high linguistic diversity such as Sub-Saharan Africa and India. Linguist Ekkehard Wolff estimates that 50% of the population of Africa is multilingual.

In multilingual societies, not all speakers need to be multilingual. Some states can have multilingual policies and recognize several official languages, such as Canada (English and French). In some states, particular languages may be associated with particular regions in the state (e.g., Canada) or with particular ethnicities (e.g., Malaysia and Singapore). When all speakers are multilingual, linguists classify the community according to the functional distribution of the languages involved:

- Diglossia: if there is a structural-functional distribution of the languages involved, the society is termed 'diglossic'. Typical diglossic areas are those areas in Europe where a regional language is used in informal, usually oral, contexts, while the state language is used in more formal situations. Frisia (with Frisian and German or Dutch) and Lusatia (with Sorbian and German) are well-known examples. Some writers limit diglossia to situations where the languages are closely related and could be considered dialects of each other. This can also be observed in Scotland where, in formal situations, English is used. However, in informal situations in many areas, Scots is the preferred language of choice. A similar phenomenon is also observed in Arabic-speaking regions. The effects of diglossia can be seen in the difference between written Arabic (Modern Standard Arabic) and colloquial Arabic. However, as time has passed, Arabic speakers have developed what some have deemed "Middle Arabic" or "Common Arabic", somewhere between the two extremes. Because of this diversification of the language, the concept of spectroglossia has been suggested.
- Ambilingualism: a region is called ambilingual if this functional distribution is not observed. In a typical ambilingual area it is nearly impossible to predict which language will be used in a given setting. True ambilingualism is rare. Ambilingual tendencies can be found in small states with multiple heritages, like Luxembourg, which has a combined Franco-Germanic heritage, or Malaysia and Singapore, which fuse the cultures of Malays, Chinese people, and Indians, as well as in communities with high rates of deafness, like Martha's Vineyard, where historically most inhabitants spoke both Martha's Vineyard Sign Language and English, or southern Israel, where locals tend to speak both Al-Sayyid Bedouin Sign Language and Arabic or Hebrew. Ambilingualism also can manifest in specific regions of larger states that have both a dominant state language (be it de jure or de facto) and a protected minority language that is limited in terms of the distribution of speakers within the country. This tendency is especially pronounced when, even though the local language is widely spoken, there is a reasonable assumption that all citizens speak the predominant state tongue (e.g., English in Quebec vs. all of Canada; Spanish in Catalonia vs. all of Spain). This phenomenon can also occur in border regions with many cross-border contacts.
- Bipart-lingualism: if more than one language can be heard in a small area, but the large majority of speakers are monolinguals, who have little contact with speakers from neighboring ethnic groups, an area is called 'bipart-lingual'. An example of this is the Balkans.

Note that the terms given above all refer to situations describing only two languages. In cases of an unspecified number of languages, the terms polyglossia, omnilingualism, and multipart-lingualism are more appropriate.

Taxell's paradox refers to the notion that monolingual solutions are essential to the realization of functional bilingualism, with multilingual solutions ultimately leading to monolingualism. The theory is based on the observation of the Swedish language in Finland in environments such as schools is subordinated to the majority language Finnish for practical and social reasons, despite the positive characteristics associated with mutual language learning.

== Interaction between speakers of different languages ==
Whenever two people meet, negotiations take place. If they want to express solidarity and sympathy, they tend to seek common features in their behavior. If speakers wish to express distance towards or even dislike of the person they are speaking to, the reverse is true, and differences are sought. This mechanism also extends to language, as described by the communication accommodation theory.

Some multilingual people use code-switching, which involves swapping between languages. In many cases, code-switching allows speakers to participate in more than one cultural group or environment. Code-switching may also function as a strategy where proficiency is lacking. Such strategies are common if the vocabulary of one of the languages is not very elaborated for certain fields, or if the speakers have not developed proficiency in certain lexical domains, as in the case of immigrant languages.

This code-switching appears in many forms. If a speaker has a positive attitude towards both languages and towards code-switching, many switches can be found, even within the same sentence. If however, the speaker is reluctant to use code-switching, as in the case of a lack of proficiency, he might knowingly or unknowingly try to camouflage his attempt by converting elements of one language into elements of the other language through calquing. This results in speakers using terms like courrier noir (literally, mail that is black) in French, instead of the proper word for blackmail in French, chantage.

Sometimes pidgins develop. A pidgin is a fusion of two or more languages that is grammatically simplified but can be understood by native speakers of any of the original languages. Some pidgins develop into "real" creole languages (such as Papiamento in Curaçao), while others simply evolve into slangs or jargons (such as Helsinki slang, which remains more or less mutually intelligible with standard Finnish and Swedish). In other cases, prolonged influence of languages on each other may have the effect of changing one or both of them to the point a new, non-creole language is born. For example, many linguists believe that the Occitan language and the Catalan language were formed because a population speaking a single Occitano-Romance language was divided by the political spheres of influence of France and Spain, respectively. Yiddish is a complex blend of Middle High German with Hebrew and also has borrowings from Slavic languages.

Bilingual interaction can even take place without speakers switching between languages or fusing them together. In certain areas, it is not uncommon for speakers to use a different language within the same conversation. This phenomenon is found, amongst other places, in Scandinavia. Most speakers of Swedish, Norwegian and Danish can communicate with each other speaking their respective languages, while few can speak both (people used to these situations often adjust their language, avoiding words that are not found in the other language or that can be misunderstood).

Using different languages is usually called non-convergent discourse, a term introduced by the Dutch linguist Reitze Jonkman. To a certain extent, this situation also exists between Dutch and Afrikaans, although everyday contact is fairly rare because of the distance between the two respective communities. Another example is the former state of Czechoslovakia, where two closely related and mutually intelligible languages (Czech and Slovak) were in common use. Most Czechs and Slovaks understand both languages, although they would use only one of them (their respective mother tongue) when speaking. For example, in Czechoslovakia, it was common to hear two people talking on television each speaking a different language without any difficulty understanding each other. This bilingualism still exists nowadays, although it has started to deteriorate since Czechoslovakia split up.

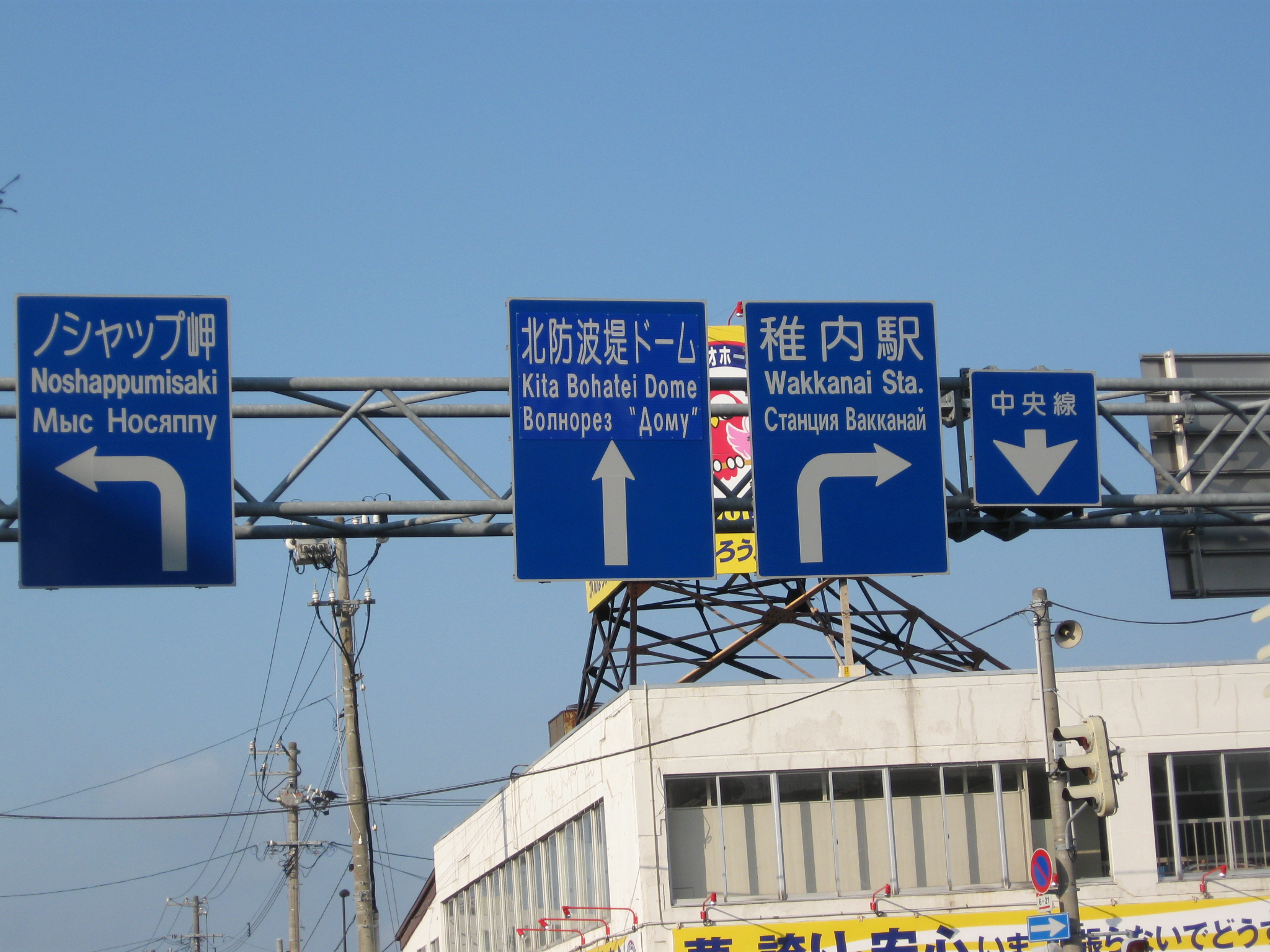
Japanese, English, and Russian sign in Northern Japan

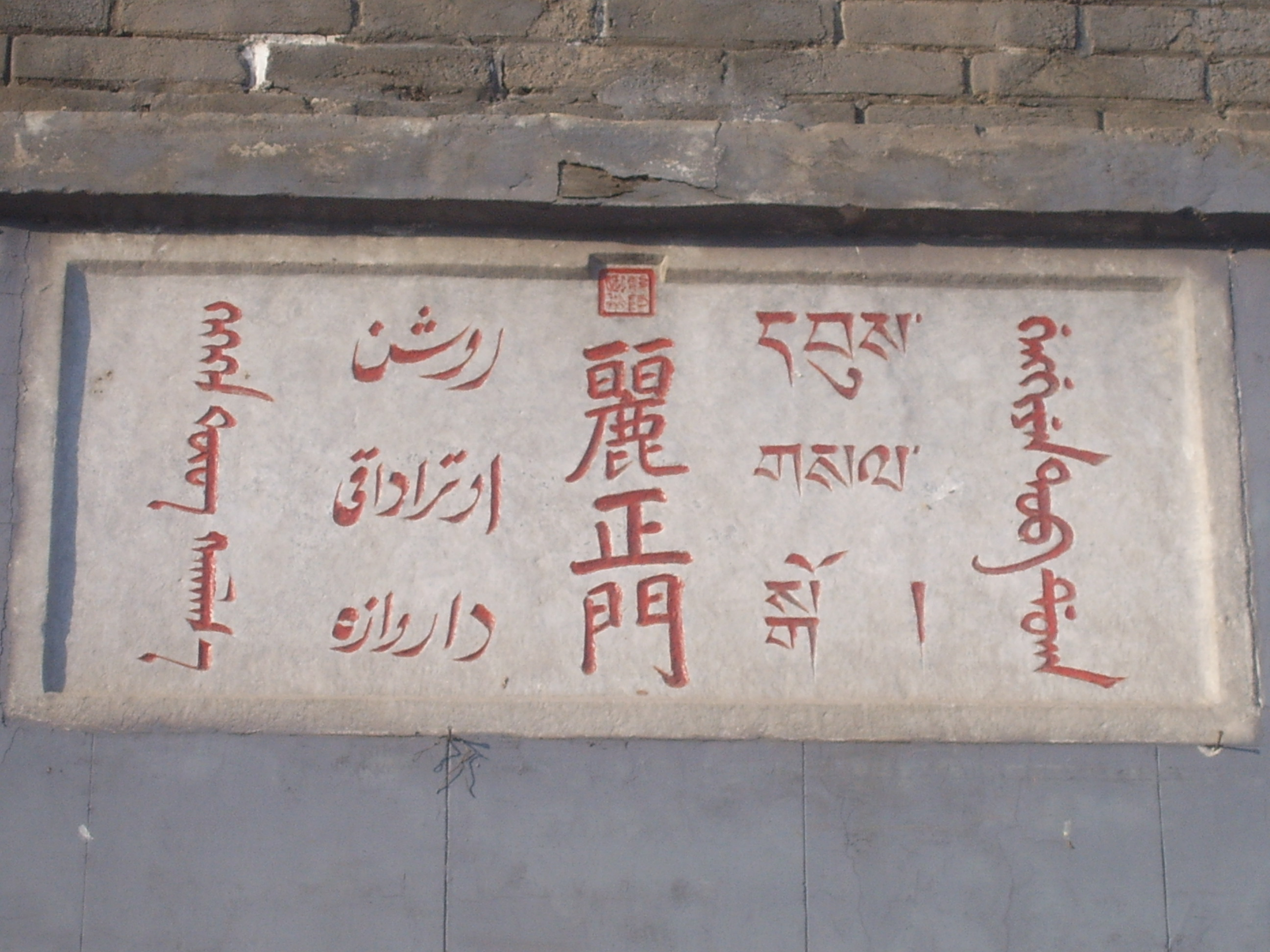
Mongolian, Chagatai, Chinese, Tibetan, and Manchu sign in Chengde, China

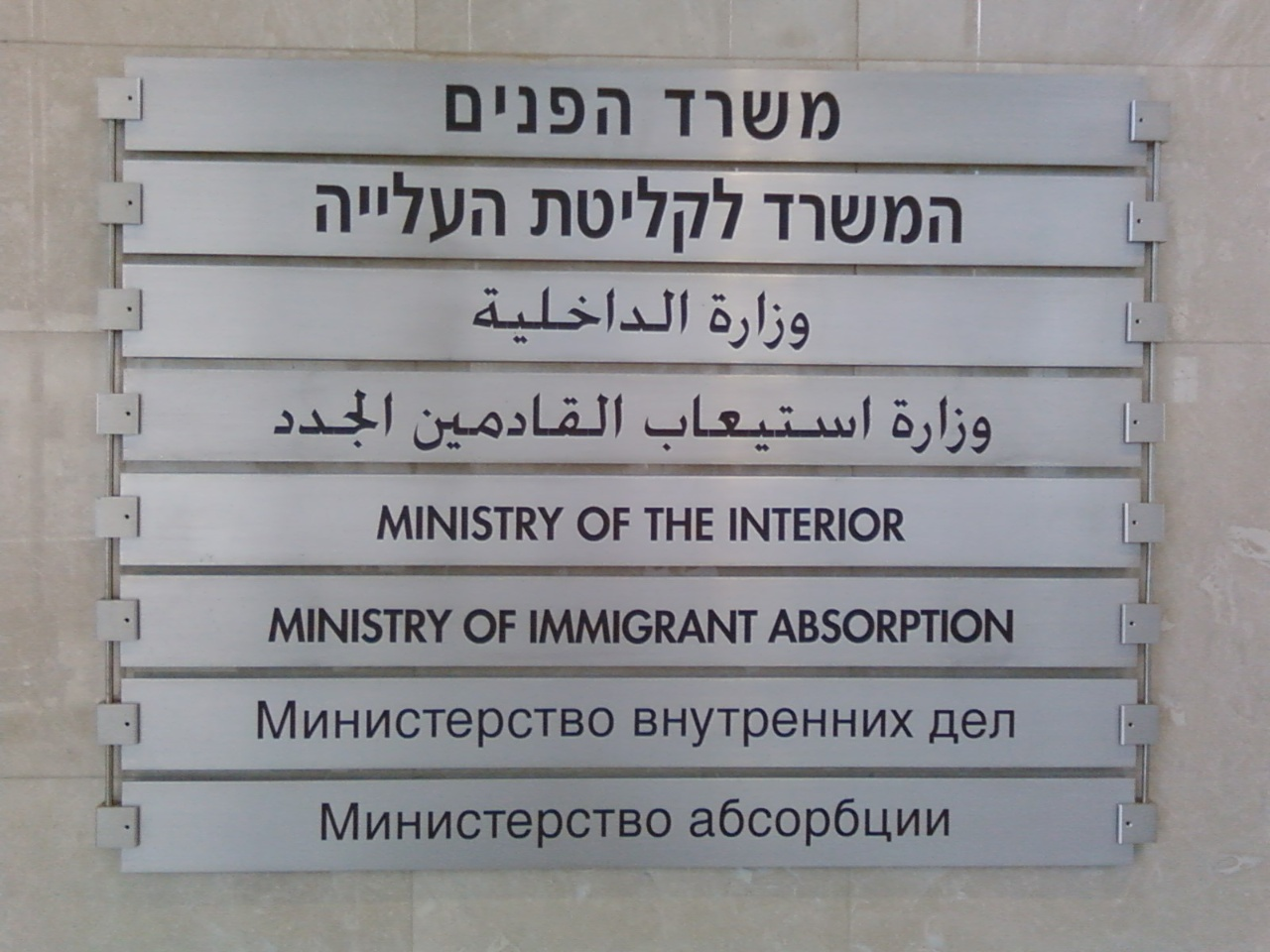
A sign at the Israeli Ministry of Interior and Ministry of Immigration and Absorption in Haifa in 2009 uses Hebrew, Arabic, English, and Russian

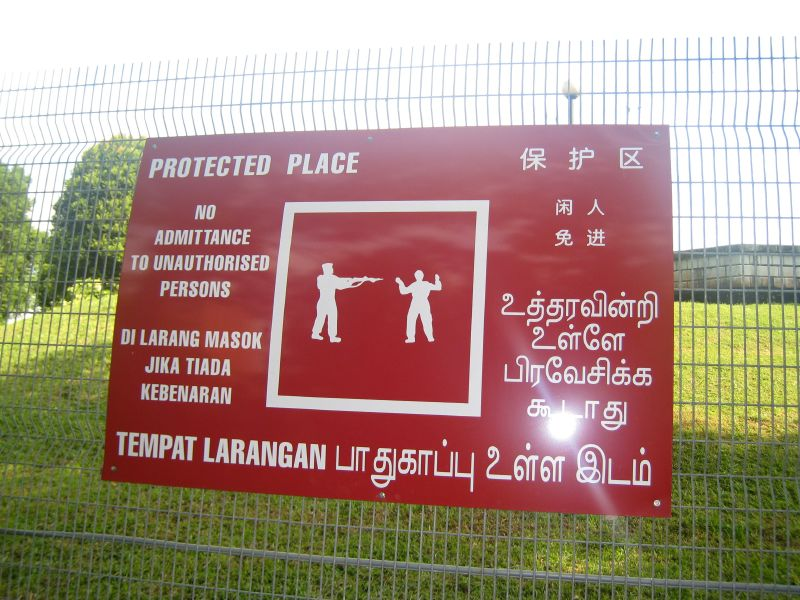
A multilingual sign in Singapore's four official languages: English, Chinese, Tamil, and Malay

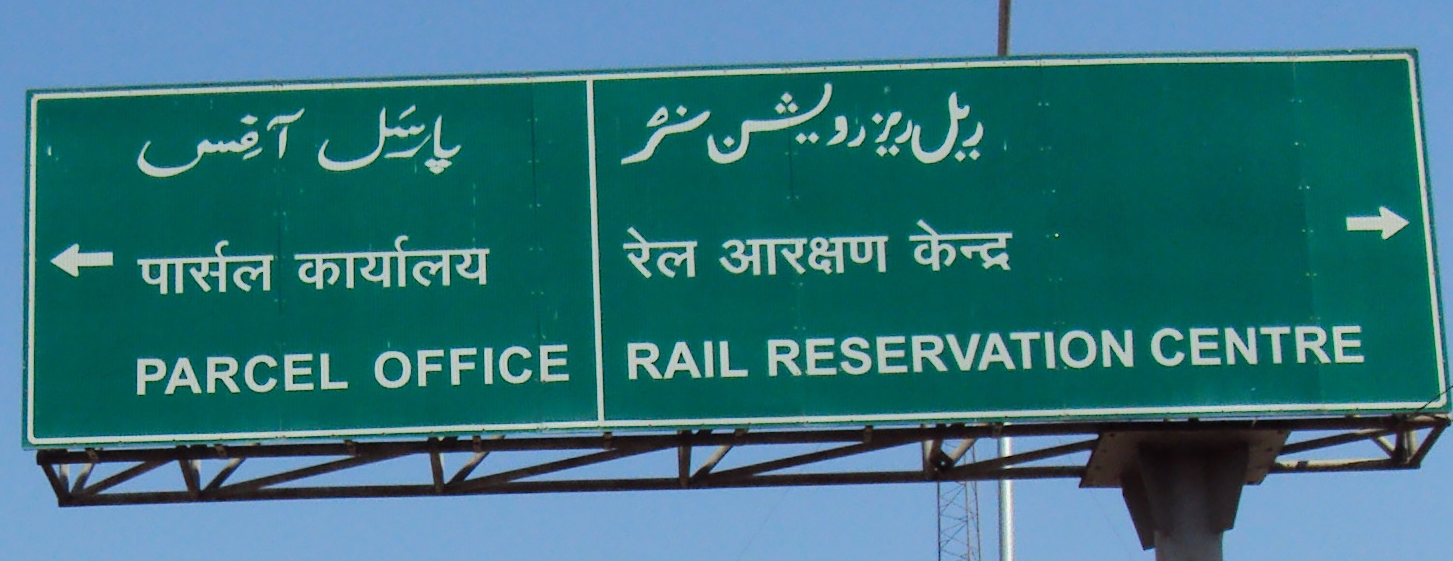
Urdu, Hindi, and English on a road sign in India

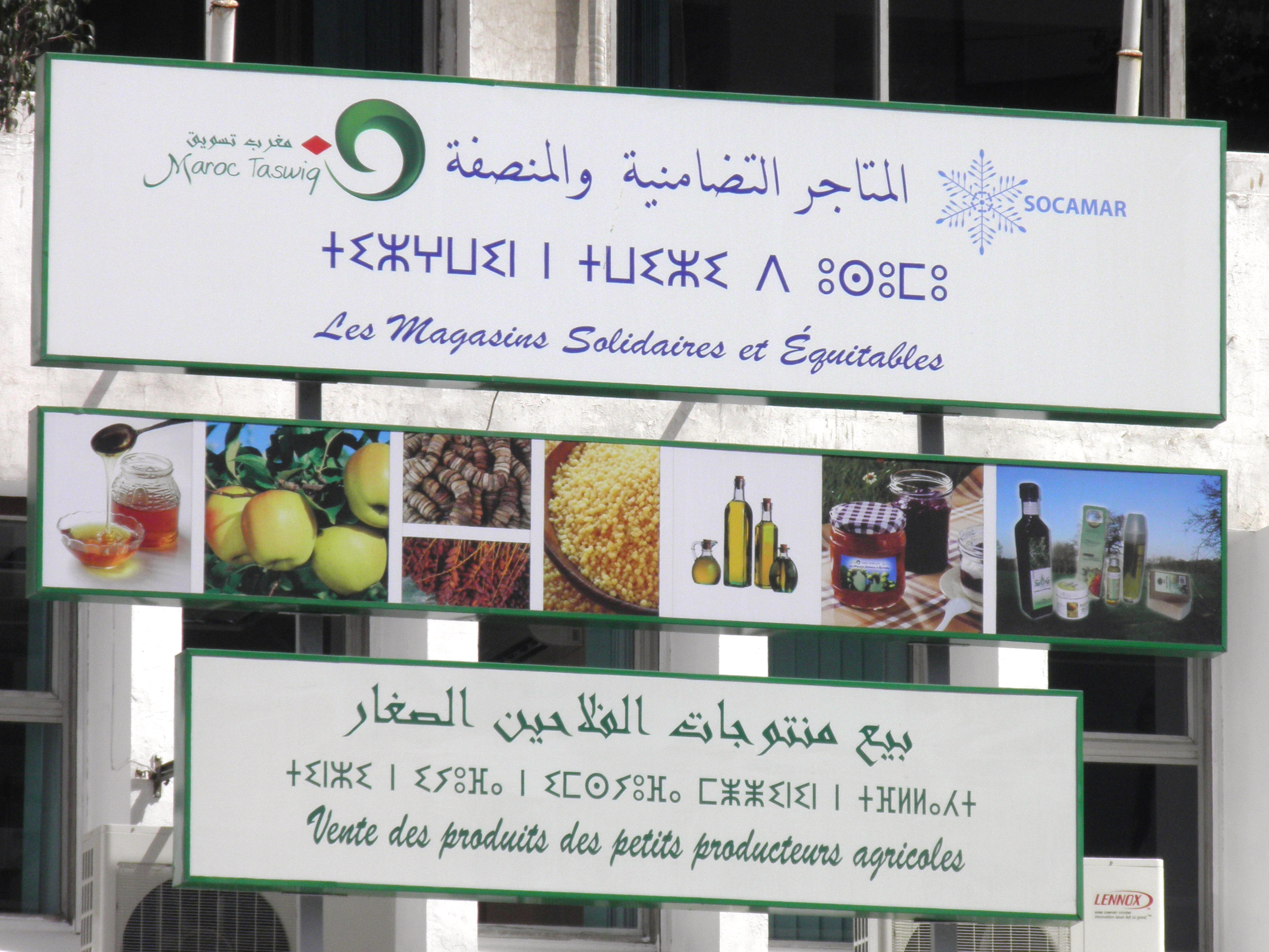
A sign in Morocco uses Arabic, Berber (written in Tifinagh), and French

== Computing ==
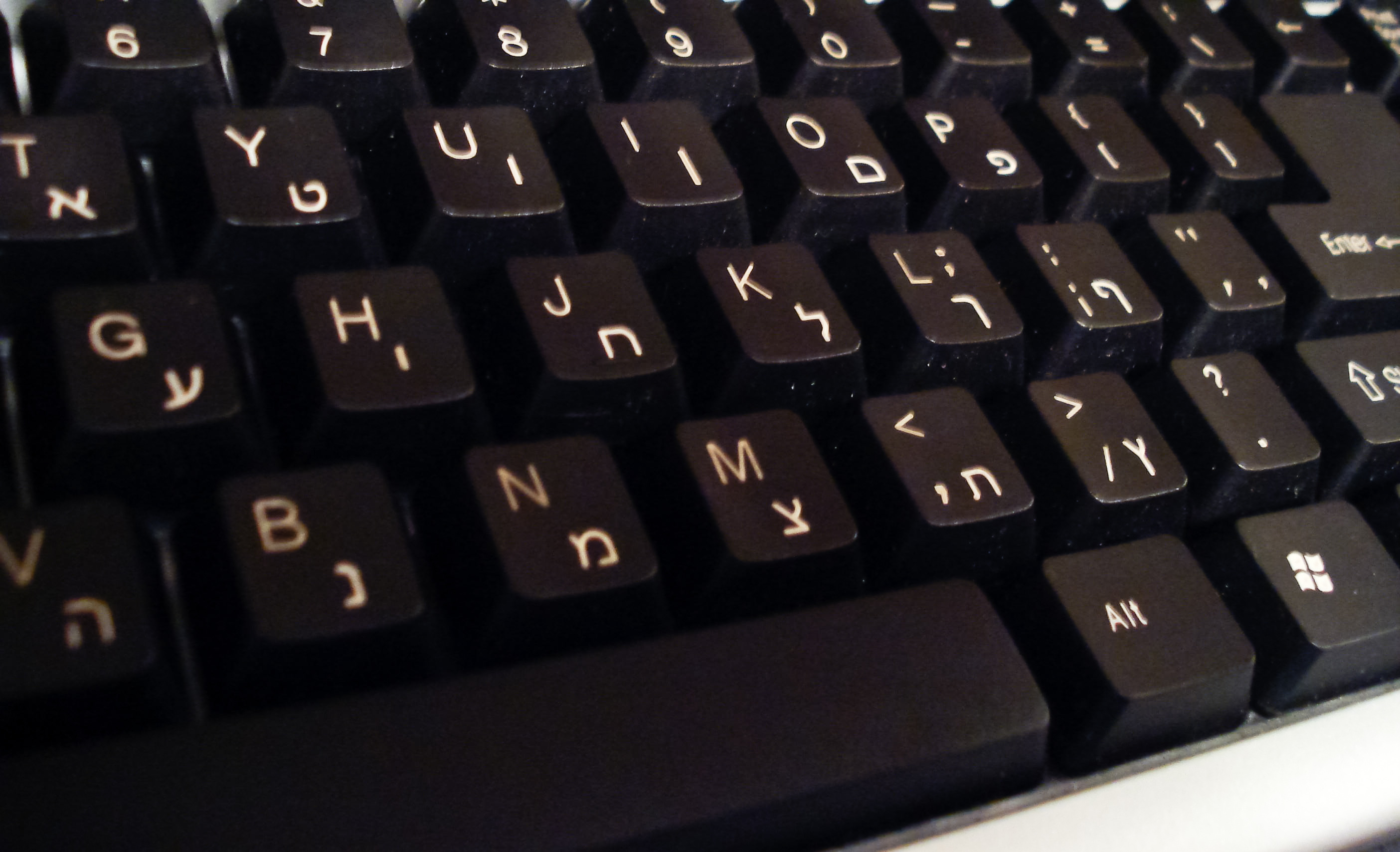
Dual-language Hebrew and English keyboard

Multilingualisation (or "m17n", where "17" stands for 17 omitted letters) of computer systems can be considered part of a continuum between internationalization and localization:

- A localized system has been adapted or converted for a particular locale (other than the one it was originally developed for), including the language of the user interface, input, and display, and features such as time/date display and currency; but each instance of the system only supports a single locale.
- Multilingualised software supports multiple languages for display and input simultaneously, but generally has a single user interface language. Support for other locale features like time, date, number and currency formats may vary as the system tends towards full internationalization. Generally, a multilingual system is intended for use in a specific locale, whilst allowing for multilingual content.
- An internationalized system is equipped for use in a range of locales, allowing for the co-existence of several languages and character sets in user interfaces and displays. In particular, a system may not be considered internationalized in the fullest sense unless the interface language is selectable by the user at runtime.

Translating the user interface is usually part of the software localization process, which also includes adaptations such as units and date conversion. Many software applications are available in several languages, ranging from a handful (the most spoken languages) to dozens for the most popular applications (such as office suites, web browsers, etc.). Due to the status of English in computing, software development nearly always uses it (but see also Non-English-based programming languages), so almost all commercial software is initially available in an English version, and multilingual versions, if any, may be produced as alternative options based on the English original.

The Multilingual App Toolkit (MAT) was first released in concert with the release of Windows 8 as a way to provide developers a set of free tooling that enabled adding languages to their apps with just a few clicks, in large part due to the integration of a free, unlimited license to both the Microsoft Translator machine translation service and the Microsoft Language Platform service, along with platform extensibility to enable anyone to add translation services into MAT. Microsoft engineers and inventors of MAT Jan A. Nelson and Camerum Lerum have continued to drive the development of the tools, working with third parties and standards bodies to ensure that broad availability of multilingual app development is provided. With the release of Windows 10, MAT is now delivering support for cross-platform development for Universal Windows Platform apps as well as for iOS and Android apps.

== Worldwide ==
=== English-speaking countries ===
According to Hewitt (2008) entrepreneurs in London from Poland, China, and Turkey tend to use English for communication with customers, suppliers, and banks but their native languages for work tasks and other social purposes. Even in English-speaking countries, immigrants can often still use their mother tongue in the workplace thanks to the presence of other immigrants in that workplace who come from the same place. Kovacs (2004) describes this phenomenon in Australia with Finnish immigrants in the construction industry who spoke Finnish during working hours. Although foreign languages may be used in the workplace, English is still a key working skill.

=== Asia ===
Asian languages used in multiple countries include:

- Arabic in many countries across the Middle East and North Africa.
- Chinese languages (namely Standard Mandarin in China, Taiwan, Singapore, and a minority in Malaysia; Cantonese in southern China, and many Overseas Chinese communities in Southeast Asia)

Many Asian companies, due to increasing globalization, have recently been focusing more and more on their employees' English proficiency. Especially in South Korea since the 1990s, Asian companies have lately used different English language tests to evaluate job applicants, and the standards for these tests continue to be raised. Meanwhile, Japan ranks 53rd out of 100 countries in 2019 EF English Proficiency Index, amid calls for this to improve in time for the 2020 Tokyo Olympics.

Within multiracial countries such as Malaysia and Singapore, it is not unusual for one to speak two or more languages, albeit with varying degrees of fluency. Some are proficient in several Chinese varieties, given the linguistic diversity of the ethnic Chinese community in both countries. In Singapore, bilingualism is embraced in the education system with English as the medium of instruction and the official mother tongue taught as a second language.

=== Africa ===
In Africa, knowledge of English is important not only for multinational companies but also in the fields of engineering, chemistry, electricity and aeronautics. A study directed by Hill and van Zyl (2002) shows that in South Africa young black engineers used English most often for communication and documentation. However, Afrikaans and other local languages were also used to explain particular concepts to workers in order to ensure understanding and cooperation.

=== Europe ===
A Welsh Government video of an English medium school in Wales, where introducing a second language (Welsh) has boosted the exam results

European languages that are used in multiple countries include:

- German in Germany, Austria, Switzerland, Liechtenstein, Luxembourg, and Belgium; and to an extent in Namibia.
- Greek in Greece, Cyprus, southern Albania, and Italy (in Calabria and Salento).
- French in France, Belgium, Luxembourg, Monaco, Andorra, and Switzerland; and to a co-official extent in Canada, as well as much of Francophone Africa including Algeria, Benin, Burkina Faso, Burundi, Cameroon, Central African Republic, Chad, Comoros, Republic of the Congo, Democratic Republic of the Congo, Côte d'Ivoire, Djibouti, Equatorial Guinea, Gabon, Gambia, Guinea, Guinea-Bissau, Madagascar, Mali, Mauritania, Mauritius, Morocco, Niger, Rwanda, Senegal, Seychelles, Togo, and Tunisia.
- Spanish in Spain, Andorra, much of the Hispanic America including Mexico, Argentina, Bolivia, Paraguay, Peru, etc.; Equatorial Guinea and a significant minority in the United States.
- Portuguese in Portugal, Brazil, Angola, Mozambique, Cape Verde, Guinea-Bissau, Equatorial Guinea, São Tomé e Príncipe, Timor-Leste and Macau.
- English in the United Kingdom, United States of America, Canada, Australia, New Zealand, Ireland, Malta, South Africa, Botswana, the Gambia, Kenya, Nigeria, Zambia and Zimbabwe; much of the Caribbean including Antigua and Barbuda, The Bahamas, Barbados, Belize, Dominica, Guyana, Jamaica, and Trinidad and Tobago; to a co-official extent in India, Hong Kong, Malaysia and Singapore; and in many of the Pacific Islands including Fiji, Samoa and Tuvalu.
- Dutch in the Netherlands, Belgium, Aruba, Sint Maarten, Curaçao, Caribbean Netherlands and Suriname.
- Swedish in Sweden and Finland.
- Italian in Italy, Switzerland, and San Marino; and to a co-official extent in Vatican City and the Istria region of Slovenia and Croatia.
- Russian in Russia and Belarus and in Russian-occupied Ukraine; and to a co-official extent in some other former Soviet Union countries. Despite being spoken by some part of the population, it is not official in Estonia, Latvia, Lithuania, Moldova or Israel.

English is a commonly taught second language at schools, so it is also the most common choice for two speakers, whose native languages are different. However, some languages are so close to each other that it is generally more common when meeting to use their mother tongue rather than English. These language groups include:

- Danish, Swedish and Norwegian
- Arabic dialectic continuum
- Czech and Slovak.
- Serbian, Croatian, Bosnian and Montenegrin: standardized in the 19th century and throughout the existence of Yugoslavia, Croatian and Serbian were considered as Western and Eastern variants of a common, Serbo-Croatian language. After the breakup of Yugoslavia, each successor state proclaimed and codified its own official language. In sociolinguistics, however, these are still considered standardized varieties of one pluricentric language, all based on Shtokavian dialect, with the biggest distinction being between the Ekavian and Ijekavian pronunciation. Cyrillic and Latin writing scripts are official in Montenegrin and Serbian, while Latin is exclusively official in Bosnian and Croatian.

In multilingual countries such as Belgium (Dutch, French, and German), Finland (Finnish and Swedish), Switzerland (German, French, Italian, and Romansh), Luxembourg (Luxembourgish, French, and German), Spain (Spanish, Catalan, Basque, and Galician), and Malta (Maltese, English, and Italian), it is common to see people who have mastered two or even three of their country's chief languages.

Many minor Russian ethnic groups, such as Tatars, Bashkirs and others, are also multilingual. Moreover, with the beginning of the compulsory study of the Tatar language in Tatarstan, there has been an increase in knowledge of Tatar among the natively Russian-speaking population of the republic.

Continued global diversity has led to an increasingly multilingual population. Europe has become an excellent model to observe this newly diversified culture. The expansion of the European Union with its open labour market has provided opportunities both for well-trained professionals and unskilled workers to move to new countries to seek employment. Political changes and turmoil have also led to migration and the creation of new and more complex multilingual workplaces. In most wealthy and secure countries, immigrants are found mostly in low-paid jobs but also, increasingly, in high-status positions.

=== Americas ===
==== United States ====
English is the official language of the United States. According to the US census, there are 76 million multilingual people, 23% of the population. In March 2025 the White House released an executive order declaring, "...it is in America's best interest for the Federal Government to designate one — and only one — official language" (The White House). In 2021 there were 5.3 million students receiving English Language Learner services. Additionally, Net immigration rates have drastically increased since 2021 from 247,000 to 2.8 million in 2024 (US census).

==== Mexico ====
Mexico officially recognizes 69 national languages, consisting of Spanish and 68 indigenous languages.

==== Paraguay ====
Guaraní is an official co-language of Paraguay alongside Spanish, spoken by over 80% of the population.

== Music ==
It is extremely common for music to be written in whatever the contemporary lingua franca is. If a song is not written in a common tongue, then it is usually written in whatever is the predominant language in the musician's country of origin, or in another widely recognized language, such as English, German, Spanish, or French.

The bilingual song cycles "there..." and "Sing, Poetry" on the 2011 contemporary classical album Troika consist of musical settings of Russian poems with their English self-translation by Joseph Brodsky and Vladimir Nabokov, respectively.

Songs with lyrics in multiple languages are known as macaronic verse.

== Literature ==
=== Fiction ===
Multilingual stories, essays, and novels are often written by immigrants and second generation American authors. Chicana author Gloria E. Anzaldúa, a major figure in the fields Third World Feminism, Postcolonial Feminism, and Latino philosophy explained the author's existential sense of obligation to write multilingual literature. An often quoted passage, from her collection of stories and essays entitled Borderlands/La Frontera: The New Mestiza, states:

"Until I am free to write bilingually and to switch codes without having always to translate, while I still have to speak English or Spanish when I would rather speak Spanglish, and as long as I have to accommodate the English speakers rather than having them accommodate me, my tongue will be illegitimate. I will no longer be made to feel ashamed of existing. I will have my voice: Indian, Spanish, white. I will have my serpent's tongue – my woman's voice, my sexual voice, my poet's voice. I will overcome the tradition of silence".

Multilingual novels by Chimamanda Ngozi Adichie display phrases in Igbo with translations, as in her early works Purple Hibiscus and Half of a Yellow Sun. However, in her later novel Americanah, the author does not offer translations of non-English passages. The House on Mango Street by Sandra Cisneros is an example of Chicano literature that leaves Spanish words and phrases untranslated (though italicized) throughout the text.

American novelists who use foreign languages (outside of their own cultural heritage) for literary effect include Cormac McCarthy, who uses untranslated Spanish and Spanglish in his fiction.

=== Poetry ===
Multilingual poetry is prevalent in the United States' Latino literature, where code-switching and translanguaging between English, Spanish, and Spanglish is common within a single poem or throughout a book of poems. Latino poetry is also written in Portuguese and can include phrases in Nahuatl, Mayan, Huichol, Arawakan, and other indigenous languages related to the Latino experience. Contemporary multilingual Latino American poets include Giannina Braschi, Ana Castillo, Sandra Cisneros, and Guillermo Gómez-Peña.

The British-Cuban political activist, surrealist poet and artist Mary Stanley Low published the trilingual poetry volume Tres voces – Three Voices – Trois Vois in 1957, which featured poetry in English, Spanish and French.

== Terms for speakers ==
- monolingual, monoglot - 1 language spoken
- bilingual, diglot - 2 languages spoken
- trilingual, triglot - 3 languages spoken
- quadrilingual, tetraglot - 4 languages spoken
- quintilingual or quinquelingual, pentaglot - 5 languages spoken
- sexalingual, hexaglot - 6 languages spoken
- septilingual or septalingual, heptaglot - 7 languages spoken
- octolingual or octalingual, octoglot - 8 languages spoken
- novelingual or nonalingual, enneaglot - 9 languages spoken
- decalingual, decaglot - 10 languages spoken
- undecalingual, hendecaglot - 11 languages spoken
- duodecalingual, dodecaglot - 12 languages spoken

== Film and television ==
The 2021 Indian documentary film Dreaming of Words traces the life and work of Njattyela Sreedharan, a fourth standard drop-out, who compiled a multilingual dictionary connecting four major Dravidian languages: Malayalam, Kannada, Tamil and Telugu. Travelling across four states and doing extensive research, he spent twenty five years making this multilingual dictionary.

Can This Love Be Translated? is a South Korean Netflix miniseries released on January 16th 2026. It stars Kim Seon-ho as multilingual interpreter Joo Ho-jin, Go Youn-jung as aspiring actress Cha Mu-hee, and Sôta Fukushi as famous actor Hiro Kurosawa. It has 12 episodes all released on the same day on the streaming service Netflix.

In 1899, only in the English audio track, the characters, who are played by actors of different nationalities, speak in their original languages, with a total of 8 languages being broadcast.

== See also ==
- Cultural diversity – Quality of diverse or different cultures
- Digraphia – Using multiple writing systems for one language
- Economics of language
- Interlinguistics – Subfield of linguistics
- Language observatory – Project for measuring language activity in a society
- Linguapax Prize
- Linguistic rights – Right to choose one's own language
- List of multilingual countries and regions
- Metatypy – Type of linguistic change due to language contact
- Multilingualism and globalization – Relationship between multilingualism & globalization
- Official multilingualism – State recognition of multiple languages
- Plurilingualism – Ability to switch between languages
- One person, one language – Linguistic parenting method
- Spanish language in the United States
- The Multilingual Library – Library in Oslo, Norway
- Unexpected bilingualism – Form of language acquisition in autistic people

=== Legislation and movements ===
- English-only movement – Political movement in the U.S.
- European Commissioner for Multilingualism
- European Day of Languages – International observance, September 26
- International Mother Language Day – Annual observance to promote awareness of linguistic and cultural diversity
- Language legislation in Belgium – Belgian legislation
- Languages of the European Union
- Official languages of the United Nations

=== Education ===
- Multilingual education – Multilingual teaching
  - In Africa
