= Language observatory =

Project for measuring language activity in a society

A language observatory is something which is built or implemented to observe and measure language activities in society.

== The need for observatories ==
According to the UNESCO report Atlas of the World's Languages in Danger, between 6,000 and 7,000 languages are spoken throughout the world, and that many more have become extinct. Concerns regarding content online have been expressed. Another UNESCO document, "Recommendation concerning the Promotion and Use of Multilingualism and Universal Access to Cyberspace", issued in 2003, noted in its preamble that "linguistic diversity in the global information networks and universal access to information in cyberspace are at the core of contemporary debates and can be a determining factor in the development of a knowledge-based society", and recommended that UNESCO establish "a collaborative online observatory on existing policies, regulations, technical recommendations, and best practices relating to multilingualism and multilingual resources and applications, including innovations in language computerization."

In 2018, was created the UNESCO Chair Language Policies for Multilingualism (link broken) as a research network to generate knowledge on the different contexts of multilingualism so to help the development of UNESCO policies, such as the Promotion of Multilingualism in Cyberspace, and the development of the UNESCO Atlas of the World Languages.

To further update policy UNESCO in 2025 issued the Global Roadmap for Multilingualism in the Digital Era.

== Language observatories in the world ==
Several language observatory activities and projects have already emerged in various parts of the world, such as Language Observatory, and UNESCO Observatory on the Information Society, which has a section focusing on Cultural Diversity and Multilingualism.

One observatory which is dedicated to produce indicators of the presence of languages in the Internet, "The Observatory of linguistic and cultural diversity on the Internet (OBDILCI) " was active between 1998 and 2009, and regained activity in 2017. It has been updating since then with yearly indicators for 329 languages, and providing data base access to those indicators. OBDILCI claims there is Western bias in the commonly quoted figures for web content and that it uses a more complicated, but less biased, approach. According to OBDILCI, as of May 2023, only 20% of web content is in English. Further, 19% is in Chinese, 7.8% is in Spanish, and Arabic, Hindi, Russian, French and Portuguese each make up around 3.5% of web content.
