= Unexpected bilingualism =

Form of language acquisition in autistic people

Unexpected bilingualism (UB), also known as spontaneous foreign language acquisition or unexpected non-interactive foreign language acquisition, is a phenomenon observed in people with autism spectrum disorder (ASD), wherein they spontaneously develop proficiency in a language that is not spoken around them. Persons with UB acquire foreign languages by exposure to screens through media like television, YouTube or video games. The phenomenon has seen a rise in prevalence since the advent of the internet, due to the increased presence of screens; the extensive lockdowns during the COVID-19 pandemic may also have contributed to this increase.

The exact number of autistic people with UB is not yet fully known, but research suggests it might be more common than originally thought. In one study it was found that 25% of the autistic participants exhibited unexpected bilingualism in a total sample of 46 autistic children.

Spontaneous language development can be viewed as a manifestation of splinter skill.

== Description of phenomenon ==
Since the interest in unexpected bilingualism has only recently emerged due to the increase in cases, there is not yet one universally accepted definition nor any established inclusion criteria for unexpected bilingualism. Generally, UB is characterized by the spontaneous acquisition of a language not used by the person's parents or used in their residential area, but rather through the use of screens.

People with UB often prefer to speak their chosen language over the language(s) spoken around them to a greater or lesser degree, and might sometimes almost exclusively communicate in their chosen language. The preferred language might also in some cases be notably more developed than their ambient language, with some switching to their chosen language when they cannot express themselves using other languages.

Because of the substantial presence of English-language media on the internet, many people with UB from non-English-speaking countries acquire English as their chosen language. Cases of people learning other languages have also been reported. There have been accounts, both academic as well as unofficially within the autism community, of autistic individuals speaking in a different dialect than the ambient one because of media exposure, a phenomenon that has been linked with unexpected bilingualism. Many autistic children in Arab countries have also been documented to spontaneously acquire a mastery of Modern Standard Arabic and use it in everyday settings, something normally uncommon for children to do.

People with UB often have a special interest in the language (and corresponding culture) they acquired spontaneously. This special interest often arises from the availability of content in different languages on the internet, or on streaming platforms where it is possible for the people to switch the language of the show or movie they are watching. It has been found that people with UB frequently not only show an interest in their acquired languages, but in languages in general, and regularly engage in watching and seeking out content in many different languages simultaneously. These languages are often ones with substantial presences on the internet, most often English but also Russian, Spanish and Japanese. Other times individuals with UB have special interests which they engage with specifically in their chosen language.

== Language development and use ==
Generally, children with unexpected bilingualism have a different acquisition pathway, relying more on the structural properties of the language input, as opposed to socio-communicative interactions crucial to typical language development. UB children acquire structural morpho-syntactic and grammatical properties of their chosen foreign language despite the absence of reciprocal communication, instead purely through screen and non-interactive input. In contrast to this, previous evidence has suggested that passive screen exposure to linguistic input is not sufficient for typically developing children to acquire core linguistic understandings of new languages. On top of this, one study found that despite autistic children with UB having shorter periods of exposure to their chosen languages, they had obtained comparable mastery to children who had acquired the language naturalistically. In the same study the parents of the children with UB even reported higher levels of proficiency in their children than the parents of both typically developing children and autistic children with a naturalistic language acquisition of the given language.

The ability in the expected language does not necessarily dictate the ability in the chosen one; in some children the ambient language might be dominant, but in many others the spontaneously acquired one will be the most dominant one. In one study researching the unexpected acquisition of English in native Hebrew-speaking children with ASD compared to native bilingual Hebrew/English children (with and without ASD), there was not found any significant differences in the English of the three groups, but found great variation in the mastery of Hebrew in the children with UB. While some of the UB children were proficient in both languages, others did not fully acquire Hebrew and instead switched to English when their Hebrew was not sufficient. Other children preferred solely to speak in English. In some cases, children with UB display word retrieval problems, accent changes and morphological errors in their ambient language, worrying some parents and caregivers and posing the question as to whether to encourage the use of the non-ambient language. Some children with UB might even produce their first words in English, as opposed to the language spoken around them.

== Possible causes ==
While unexpected bilingualism is triggered by exposure to screens, the exact cause of UB is unknown, though research has been made into possible explanations.

Children with UB exhibit a specific cognitive profile with advanced perceptual abilities and increased attention to detail that may facilitate implicit language acquisition without natural exposure. The Weak Central Coherence (WCC) theory proclaims that autistic individuals often are more detail-oriented but in turn have poorer processing of the global context. This theory aligns with the attention to detail found in many UB children, manifesting, for example, in a focus on fine-grained acoustic differences instead of the linguistic meaning or social functioning. UB children have been found to have enhanced pitch discrimination, as well as heightened sensitivity to the linguistic concept of nonadjacent dependencies; though it is unclear whether sensitivity to nonadjacent dependencies is the cause of UB, or simply a result thereof.

The special ways autistic people process and acquire languages might impede the learning of ambient languages, as the heightened perception of nonmeaningful auditory contrasts may disrupt the acquisition of the languages' phonologies, possibly resulting in a language delay. Because of their attention to fine details, children with UB might then find it difficult to generalize speech input and their ambient language acquisition might therefore be negatively impacted. Repetitive exposure to prerecorded input may help make this complexity manageable and thus facilitate the development of stable phonological categories and language acquisition. The ability to freely replay the media can reduce the variability in the input, something which many autistic children have been attested of doing with preferred media (eg. cartoons or videos) and media segments.

Echolalic imitation in the early speech development of autistic children might also play a role in the phenomenon of unexpected bilingualism, as autistic children often produce echolalic productions, finely matching the echoed source both prosaically and phonetically. And since range of interactional experiences tend to be more reduced and the sources of linguistic input likely less varied in children with ASD, compared to typically developing children, autistic children are more likely to iterate on the linguistic non-interactive input.

=== Personal reasons ===
The existence of a special interest either in the language or culture of the newly acquired language, or media about a special interest in the chosen language, could enhance the children's motivation in learning the new language. In one study children with UB attribute their acquisition of English to internet use, as they would use the internet to explore and engage with their special interest, and television and YouTube videos have also been found to be some of the most common interests in autistic children.

The lack of the socio-communicative aspect of language learning in UB might also facilitate the learning of autistic children, as it eliminates the social pressure of face-to-face interaction that many autistic people find difficult or demanding.

Furthermore, some parents report an emotional event triggering their child's language shift to another language.
