= Hindawi Programming System =

Suite of open source programming languages

Hindawi Programming System (hereafter referred to as HPS) is a suite of open source programming languages. It allows non-English medium literates to learn and write computer programs. It is a scalable system which supports many programming paradigms.

Shaili Prathmik or Indic BASIC and Indic LOGO are for beginners who want to start with computer programming.

On the higher end it supports Shaili Guru (Indic C), Shaili Shraeni (Indic C++), Shaili Yantrik (Indic Assembly), Shaily Shabda (Indic Lex), Shaili Vyaakaran (Shaili Vyaaka/Indic Yacc), and Shaili Kritrim, which is an Indic programming language targeting JVM.

== Mechanism and algorithms ==
HPS uses Romenagri transliteration to first convert the high level source code into a compiler acceptable format and then uses an existing compiler to produce machine code.

== History ==
- The original contributor to HPS is Abhishek Choudhary who also developed APCISR and Romanagari
- Initial public release - 15 August 2004
- Release of version 2 by the ex-education minister of Bihar, Dr. Ram Prakash Mahto - 15 August 2005
- Release of Linux port under Sarai fellowship - 16 August 2006

== Awards and recognition ==
Computer Society of India's National Young IT Professional Award 2005 Sarai / CSDS FLOSS fellowship Hindawi is recognised by TDIL, Government of India. Hindawi was shortlisted for Manthan Award 2007
