= Icelandic vocabulary =

The vocabulary of the Icelandic language is heavily derived from and built upon Old Norse and contains relatively few loanwords; where these do exist, their spelling is often heavily adapted to that of other Icelandic words.

== History ==
Iceland was first settled in the 9th century by Norwegians who took captive Irish slaves. At this time, the same language was spoken in both Iceland and Norway. Vocabulary was largely Norse, and significant changes did not start to occur until the 13th and 14th centuries. Around this time, Norwegian declension and inflection became considerably simplified, whereas Icelandic's did not. This difference can be seen today by comparing the two modern languages.

The introduction of Christianity to Iceland in the 11th century brought with it a need to describe new religious concepts. The majority of new words were taken from other Scandinavian languages; kirkja (‘church’) and biskup (‘bishop’), for example. The relationship between the English and Icelandic languages is made evident by such importations. Other Germanic languages, Greek, and Latin also had a lesser influence.

Numerous other languages have had their influence on Icelandic, French for example brought many words related to the court and knightship; words in the semantic field of trade and commerce have been borrowed from Low German because of trade connections. Many words were also brought in from Danish and German during the language reformation as the Bible was translated into Icelandic.

Nowadays, it is common practice to coin new compound words from Icelandic derivatives.

== Modern neologisms ==
Hlutabréfamarkaður (‘stock market’), an example of a neologistic compound word formed from hlutur (‘a share’, ‘a part’), bréf (‘a paper’, ‘a letter’) and markaður (‘a market’).

It is often the case in Icelandic that words for new concepts or ideas are composites of other words, veðurfræði (‘meteorology’), is derived from veður (‘weather’) and -fræði (‘studies’); or simply that old disused words are revived for new concepts. Like other Germanic languages, Icelandic words have a tendency to be compounded. This means that many small component words can be connected together to create a word with a new meaning. Take the example to right, hlutabréfamarkaður (‘stock market’), which is made from the words hluti (‘share’), bréf (‘paper’) and markaður (‘market’).

However, many neologisms are coined using only the stems of existing words complying with ancient practice. Two examples are þyrla (Helicopter) from a verb meaning twirl and þota (Jet) from the verb þjóta (rush). All in all the neologisms are coined by compounding or using the still active ablauts or umlauts. Both provide nearly inexhaustible sources.

However, there are some notable exceptions to this rule. Kaffi, for example, is an Icelandicised version of the French café or Italian caffè, both meaning ‘coffee’; that is to say that it has been adapted to the rules of Icelandic orthography. There are numerous other examples, including banani (in that case there was a proposed alternative, bjúgaldin, literally curved fruit, but that did not gain popularity). In situations like this, it may be awkward or impossible to create words for things that simply do not exist in Iceland by nature; therefore some form of a loanword may have to be used.

== See also ==
- High Icelandic
- Icelandic names
- Linguistic purism in Icelandic
