= Qalb (programming language) =

Programming language with Arabic keywords

قلب
- Paradigm: Functional
- Designed by: Ramsey Nasser
- First appeared: 2012
- Website: nas.sr/%D9%82%D9%84%D8%A8

Influenced by
- Scheme

قلب (Levantine Arabic: [ʔalb]), transliterated Qalb, Qlb and Alb, is a functional programming language allowing a programmer to write programs completely in Arabic. Its name means "heart" in Arabic and is a recursive acronym for Qlb: a programming language (قلب: لغة برمجة, Qlb: Lughat Barmajah). It was developed in 2012 by Ramsey Nasser, a computer scientist at the Eyebeam Art + Technology Center in New York City, as both an artistic endeavor and as a response to the Anglophone bias in the vast majority of programming languages, which express their fundamental concepts using English words.

The syntax is like that of Lisp or Scheme, consisting of parenthesized lists. Keywords are in Arabic (specifically, Lebanese Arabic) and program text is laid out right-to-left, like all Arabic text. The language provides a minimal set of primitives for defining functions, conditionals, looping, list manipulation, and basic arithmetic expressions. It is Turing-complete, and the Fibonacci sequence and Conway's Game of Life have been implemented.

Because program text is written in Arabic and the connecting strokes between characters in the Arabic script can be extended to any length, it is possible to align the source code in artistic patterns, in the tradition of Arabic calligraphy.

A JavaScript-based interpreter is currently self hosted and the project can be forked on GitHub.

== Hello world ==
(قول "مرحبا يا عالم!")

(say "Hello, world!")
