= Index of computing articles =

Originally, the word computing was synonymous with counting and calculating, and the science and technology of mathematical calculations. Today, "computing" means using computers and other computing machines. It includes their operation and usage, the electrical processes carried out within the computing hardware itself, and the theoretical concepts governing them (computer science).

See also: List of programmers, List of computing people, List of computer scientists, List of basic computer science topics, List of terms relating to algorithms and data structures.

Topics on computing include:

== 0–9 ==
1.TR.6 – 100BaseVG – 100VG-AnyLAN – 10BASE-2 – 10BASE-5 – 10BASE-T – 120 reset – 1-bit computing – 16-bit computing – 16550 UART – 1NF – 1TBS –

20-GATE – 20-GATE – 2B1D – 2B1Q – 2D – 2NF –

3-tier (computing) – 32-bit application – 32-bit computing – 320xx microprocessor – 386BSD – 3Com Corporation – 3DO – 3D computer graphics – 3GL – 3NF – 3Station –

4.2BSD – 4-bit computing – 404 error – 431A – 473L system – 486SX – 4GL – 4NF –

51-FORTH – 56 kbit/s line – 5ESS switch – 5NF – 5th Glove –

6.001 – 64-bit computing – 680x0 – 6x86 –

8-bit clean – 8-bit computing – 8.3 filename – 80x86 – 82430FX – 82430HX – 82430MX – 82430VX – 8514 (display standard) – 8514-A – 88open – 8N1 – 8x86 –

90–90 rule – 9PAC

== A ==
ABC ALGOL – ABLE – ABSET – ABSYS – Accent – Acceptance, Test Or Launch Language – Accessible Computing – Ada – Addressing mode – AIM alliance – AirPort – AIX – Algocracy – ALGOL – Algorithm – AltiVec – Amazon Web Services – Amdahl's law – America Online – Amiga – AmigaE – Analysis of algorithms – AOL – APL – Apple Computer, Inc. – Apple II – AppleScript – Array programming – Arithmetic and logical unit – ASCII – Active Server Pages – ASP.NET – Assembly language – Atari – Atlas Autocode – AutoLISP – Automaton – AWK – Microsoft Azure

== B ==
B (programming language) – Backus–Naur form – Basic Rate Interface (2B+D) – BASIC – Batch job – BCPL – Befunge – BeOS – Berkeley Software Distribution – BETA – Big O notation – Binary symmetric channel – Binary Synchronous Transmission – Binary numeral system – Bit – BLISS – Blu-ray – Blue screen of death – Bourne shell (sh) Bourne-Again shell (bash) – Better Portable Graphics (BPG) – Brainfuck – Btrieve – Burrows–Abadi–Needham logic – Business computing

== C ==
C++ – C# – C – Cache – Canonical LR parser – Cat (Unix) – CD-ROM – Central processing unit – Chimera – Chomsky normal form – CIH virus – Classic Mac OS – Cloud Computing – COBOL – Cocoa (software) – Code and fix – Code Red worm – ColdFusion – Colouring algorithm – COMAL – Comm (Unix) – Command line interface – Command line interpreter – COMMAND.COM – Commercial at (computing) – Commodore 1541 – Commodore 1581 – Commodore 64 – Common logarithm – Compact disc – Compiler – Computability theory – Computational complexity theory – Computation – Computer-aided design – Computer-aided manufacturing – Computer architecture – Computer cluster – Computer hardware – Computer monitor – Computer network – Computer numbering format – Computer programming – Computer science – Computer security – Computer software – Computer system – Computer – Computing – Context-free grammar – Context-sensitive grammar – Context-sensitive language – Control flow – Control store – Control unit – CORAL66 – CP/M – CPL – Cracking (software) – Cracking (passwords) – Cryptanalysis – Cryptography – CUPS – Cybersquatting – CYK algorithm – Cyrix 6x86

== D ==
D – Data compression – Database normalization – Decidable set – Deep Blue – Desktop environment – Desktop publishing – Deterministic finite automaton – Dialer – DIBOL – Diff – Digital camera – DEC (Digital Equipment Corporation) – Digital signal processing – Digital visual interface – Direct manipulation interface – Disk storage – Distance transform – Distance map – Distance field – Docblock – DVD – DVI (TeX) – Dvorak keyboard layout – Dylan

== E ==
Earth Simulator – EBCDIC – ECMAScript (a.k.a. JavaScript) – Electronic data processing (EDP) – Enhanced Versatile Disc (EVD) – ENIAC – Enterprise Java Beans (EJB) – Entscheidungsproblem – Equality (relational operator) – Erlang – Enterprise resource planning (ERP) – ES EVM – Ethernet – Euclidean algorithm – Euphoria – Exploit (computer security)

== F ==
Fast Ethernet – Federated Naming Service – Field specification – Final Cut Pro – Finite-state automaton – FireWire – First-generation language – Floating-point unit – Floppy disk – Formal language – Forth – Fortran – Fourth-generation language – Fragmentation – Free On-line Dictionary of Computing – Free Software Foundation – Free software movement – Free software – Freescale 68HC11 – Freeware – Function-level programming – Functional programming

== G ==
G5 – GEM – General Algebraic Modeling System – Genie – GNU – GNU Bison – Gnutella – Graphical user interface – Graphics Device Interface – Greibach normal form – G.hn

== H ==
hack (technology slang) – Hacker (computer security) – Hacker (hobbyist) – Hacker (programmer subculture) – Hacker (term) – Halting problem – Hard Drive – Haskell – HD DVD – History of computing – History of computing hardware – History of operating systems – History of the graphical user interface – Hitachi 6309 – Home computer – Human–computer interaction

== I ==
IA-32 – IA-64 – IBM PC – Interactive computation – IBM – iBook – iCab – iCal – Icon – iDVD – IEEE 802.2 – IEEE 802.3 – IEEE floating-point standard – iMac – Image processing – iMovie – Indentation style Inform – Instruction register – Intel 8008 – Intel 80186 – Intel 80188 – Intel 80386 – Intel 80486SX – Intel 80486 – Intel 8048 – Intel 8051 – Intel 8080 – Intel 8086 – Intel 80x86 – Intel – INTERCAL – International Electrotechnical Commission – Internet Explorer – Internet – iPhoto – iPod – iResQ – Irreversible circuit – iSync – iTunes

== J ==
J (programming language) – Java Platform, Enterprise Edition – Java Platform, Micro Edition – Java Platform, Standard Edition – Java API – Java – Java virtual machine (JVM) – JavaScript (standardized as ECMAScript) – JPEG

== K ==
K&R – KDE – Kilobyte – KL-ONE – Kleene star – Klez – Kotlin

== L ==
LALR parser – Lambda calculus – Lasso – LaTeX – Leet – Legal aspects of computing – Lex – LibreOffice – Limbo – Linked list – Linux – Lisp – List of IBM products – List of Intel processors – List of programming languages – List of operating systems – List of Soviet computer systems – LL parser – Logic programming – Logo – Lotus 1-2-3 – LR parser – Lua – Lynx language – Lynx browser

== M ==
m4 – macOS Server – macOS – Mac – MAD – Mainframe computer – Malware – Mary – Mealy machine – Megabyte – Melissa worm – Mercury – Mesa – Microcode – Microprocessor – Microprogram – Microsequencer – Microsoft – Microsoft Windows – Microsoft Windows version history – MIPS architecture - Miranda – ML – MMC – MMU – MMX – Mobile Trin – Modula – MOO – Moore's Law – Moore machine – Morris worm – MOS Technology 6502 – MOS Technology 650x – MOS Technology 6510 – Motorola 68000 – Motorola 6800 – Motorola 68020 – Motorola 68030 – Motorola 68040 – Motorola 68060 – Motorola 6809 – Motorola 680x0 – Motorola 68LC040 – Motorola 88000 – Mozilla – MPEG – MS-DOS – Multics – Multiprocessing – MUMPS

== N ==
.NET – NetBSD – Netlib – Netscape Navigator – NeXT, Inc. – Nial – Nybble – Ninety–ninety rule – Non-uniform memory access – Nondeterministic finite automaton

== O ==
Oberon – Objective-C – object – OCaml – occam – OmniWeb – One True Brace Style – OpenBSD – Open source – Open Source Initiative – OpenVMS - Opera (web browser) – Operating system advocacy – Operating system

== P ==
PA-RISC – Page description language – Pancake sorting – Parallax Propeller – Parallel computing – Parser (language) – Parsing (technique) – Partial function – Pascal – PDP – Peer-to-peer network – Perl – Personal computer – PHP – PILOT – PL/I – Pointer – Poplog – Portable Document Format (PDF) – Poser – PostScript – PowerBook – PowerPC – PowerPC G4 – Prefix grammar – Preprocessor – Primitive recursive function – Programming language – Prolog – PSPACE-complete – Pulse-code modulation (PCM) – Pushdown automaton – Python

== Q ==
QuarkXPress – QuickTime – QWERTY

== R ==
R (programming language) – RAM (random-access memory) – RAM drive – Random access – RascalMPL – Ratfor – RCA 1802 – Read-only memory (ROM) – REBOL – Recovery-oriented computing – Recursive descent parser – Recursion (computer science) – Recursive set – Recursively enumerable language – Recursively enumerable set – Reference (computer science) – Referential transparency – Register – Regular expression – Regular grammar – Regular language – RPG – Retrocomputing – REXX – RFC – RISC – RS/6000 – Ruby

== S ==
S – S-Lang – Safari (web browser) – SAIL – Script kiddie – Scripting language – SCSI – Second-generation programming language – Secure Sockets Layer – sed – Self (or SELF) – Semaphore (programming) – Sequential access – Serverless computing – SETL – Shareware – Shell script – Shellcode – SIMD – Simula – Sircam – Slide rule – SLIP – SLR parser – Smalltalk – Server Message Block – SMBus – SMIL (computer) – Smiley – SNOBOL – Software engineering – SONET – Space-cadet keyboard – SPARC International – Specialist (computer) – SPITBOL – SQL – SQL slammer worm – Squeak – SR – SSL – Service-oriented architecture – S/SL – Stale pointer bug – Standard ML (or SML) – Stateless server – Stepping level - Structured programming – Subject-oriented programming – Subnetwork – Supercomputer – Swap space – Symbolic mathematics – Symlink – Symmetric multiprocessing – Syntactic sugar – SyQuest Technology – SYSKEY – System board – System programming language – System R (IBM) – System X (supercomputer)

== T ==
TADS – Tcl – TECO (text editor) – Text editor – TeX – Third-generation language – Timeline of computing – Timeline of computing 1950–1979 – Timeline of computing 1980–1989 – Timeline of computing 1990–1999 – Timeline of computing hardware before 1950 (2400 BC–1949) – Tk – TPU – Trac – Transparency (computing) – Trin II – Trin VX – Turing machine – Turing – 2B1Q

== U ==
UAT – Unicode – Unicon – Unix – Unix shell – UNIX System V – Unlambda – USB – Unreachable memory

== V ==
Var'aq – VAX – VBScript – Vector processor – Ventura Publisher – Very-large-scale integration – Video editing – Virtual memory – Visual Basic (classic) – Visual Basic .NET – Visual FoxPro – Von Neumann architecture

== W ==
WD16 – Web 2.0 – Web browser – Western Design Center – The WELL - Western Design Center 65C02 – Western Design Center 65816 – Whitespace – Wiki – Window manager – Windows 1.0 – Windows 2000 – Windows 95 – Windows Me – Windows NT – Windows XP – Windows 7 – Word processor – World Wide Web – WYSIWYG

== X ==
X Window System – X86 – Xmouse

== Y ==
Yacc – YaST – Yet another – Yorick

== Z ==
Z notation – Z shell – Zilog Z80 – Zooming User Interface – ZX80 – ZX81 – ZX Spectrum
