= Shakespeare Programming Language =

Esoteric programming language

The Shakespeare Programming Language (SPL) is an esoteric programming language designed by Jon Åslund and Karl Wiberg. Like the Chef language, it is designed to make programs appear to be something other than programs – in this case, Shakespearean plays.

A character list in the start of the program declares some number of stacks, naturally with names like "Romeo" and "Juliet". These characters enter into dialogue with each other in which they manipulate each other's topmost values, push and pop each other, and do input/output (I/O). The characters can also ask each other questions which behave as conditional statements. On the whole, the programming model is very similar to assembly language but much more verbose.

== Programming in Shakespeare ==
=== Title ===
The first line in a Shakespeare program is called the 'title'. The compiler considers anything from the first line to the first period to be a comment.

=== Dramatis Personae ===
This is the section where variables are declared. Each variable can hold a signed integer value and is of the following form:

Name, Description

Where Name is the name of the variable and Description is ignored by the compiler. The compiler will recognize only those names that correspond to actual Shakespearean characters.

=== Acts and scenes ===
A piece of code in Shakespeare is broken into Acts which contain Scenes in which characters (variables) interact. Each Act and Scene is numbered with a Roman numeral and serves as a GOTO label. Any code after the colon is considered a comment. They are written in the form:

Act I: Hamlet's insults and flattery.
Scene I: The insulting of Romeo.

=== Enter, exit and exeunt ===
Individual lines of code generally take the form of a piece of dialogue spoken by one character to another; this is how the value of a variable (the character spoken to) is assigned, changed, or output. A character can only be addressed as "You", "Thou", or "Thee". Thus, there must typically be exactly two characters "on stage" whenever lines are spoken: one to speak, and the other to be spoken to. To call a variable to the stage the Enter command is used with a list of one or more characters. The Exit command tells exactly one listed character to leave the stage. Exeunt calls more than one character to leave, or in the case that no characters are listed all the characters will leave the stage. The following format is used:

[Enter Juliet]
[Enter Romeo and Juliet]
[Exit Romeo]
[Exeunt Romeo and Juliet]
[Exeunt]

=== Lines ===
Lines are represented as dialogue spoken by a character, and consist of at least one sentence. Each sentence may assign a new value to a variable, direct a variable to output its value, or direct it to receive an input. Lines can also manipulate stacks or act as if/then or goto statements. A line starts with a character's name and a colon. Since this character is the speaker, the other character on stage is the variable that is addressed as "You", "Thou", or "Thee".

==== Constants and assignment of values ====
Constants are represented by combinations of nouns and adjectives; the language recognizes a finite list of each, and both lists are separated into those having positive, negative, or neutral tone, as perceived by Åslund and Hasselström. Positive and neutral nouns have a value of 1 and negative nouns have a value of -1. Any adjective multiplies a noun by 2, and adjectives can be compounded. Possessive pronouns are ignored by the parser, while words pertaining to basic arithmetic are recognized as operations, such as "sum", "quotient", and "cube". A sentence that assigns a value to a character starts with "You", "Thou", or "Thee", may optionally continue with "are as [any adjective] as", and then gives the mathematical formula in nouns, adjectives, variables, and operations for the new value. Examples of such lines follow:

Hamlet:
 You lying stupid fatherless big smelly half-witted coward!

Juliet:
 You are as villainous as the square root of Romeo!

The mathematical formulae can also use the names of other characters (even if those characters are not on stage) to utilize the current value of that character in a computation, or "yourself" or "thyself" for the character being spoken to.

==== Input and output ====
Lines can also call for a variable to give output or receive input. "Open your heart" outputs the variable's numerical value, while "Speak your mind" outputs the corresponding ASCII character. "Listen to your heart" or "Open your mind" cause the variable to receive input from the user; the former for a number and the latter for a character.

==== Conditional statements and gotos ====
An if/then statement is phrased as a question posed by a character. The words "as [any adjective] as" represent a test for equality, while "better" and "worse" correspond to greater than and less than, respectively. A subsequent line, starting "if so" or "if not", determines what happens in response to the truth or falsehood of the original condition. A goto statement begins "Let us", "We shall", or "We must", continues "return to" or "proceed to", and then gives an act or scene. A scene will be parsed as that scene in the current act; a goto statement cannot call a scene in a different act. A conditional statement to call a goto would look like this:

Juliet:
 Am I better than you?

Hamlet:
 If so, let us proceed to scene II.

==== Pushing and popping stacks ====
Each variable is a stack. A variable will have an integer pushed onto its stack if a line tells the character to "remember" an appropriate value, such as "Remember me", or "Remember yourself". The topmost value in the stack is popped (i.e., the variable assumes this value) if the character is told to "recall" anything; all text after this word is treated as a comment.

== Example code ==
The standard "Hello, World!" program:

The idea is to generate the ASCII values for each character of the string and print it using the "Speak your mind" command. For instance, the first line of dialog said by Hamlet uses a combination of arithmetic operations to assign the decimal value 72 (binary 1001000) to the other protagonist Romeo, which in ASCII corresponds to the letter 'H'.

Do Not Adieu, a play in two acts.

Romeo, a young man with a remarkable patience.
Juliet, a likewise young woman of remarkable grace.
Ophelia, a remarkable woman much in dispute with Hamlet.
Hamlet, the flatterer of Andersen Insulting A/S.

                    Act I: Hamlet's insults and flattery.

                    Scene I: The insulting of Romeo.

[Enter Hamlet and Romeo]

Hamlet:
 You lying stupid fatherless big smelly half-witted coward!
 You are as stupid as the difference between a handsome rich brave
 hero and thyself! Speak your mind!

 You are as brave as the sum of your fat little stuffed misused dusty
 old rotten codpiece and a beautiful fair warm peaceful sunny summer's
 day. You are as healthy as the difference between the sum of the
 sweetest reddest rose and my father and yourself! Speak your mind!

 You are as cowardly as the sum of yourself and the difference
 between a big mighty proud kingdom and a horse. Speak your mind.

 Speak your mind!

[Exit Romeo]

                    Scene II: The praising of Juliet.

[Enter Juliet]

Hamlet:
 Thou art as sweet as the sum of the sum of Romeo and his horse and his
 black cat! Speak thy mind!

[Exit Juliet]

                    Scene III: The praising of Ophelia.

[Enter Ophelia]

Hamlet:

 Thou art as beautiful as the difference between Romeo and the square
 of a huge green peaceful tree. Speak thy mind!

 Thou art as lovely as the product of a large rural town and my amazing
 bottomless embroidered purse. Speak thy mind!

 Thou art as loving as the product of the bluest clearest sweetest sky
 and the sum of a squirrel and a white horse. Thou art as beautiful as
 the difference between Juliet and thyself. Speak thy mind!

[Exeunt Ophelia and Hamlet]

                    Act II: Behind Hamlet's back.

                    Scene I: Romeo and Juliet's conversation.

[Enter Romeo and Juliet]

Romeo:
 Speak your mind. You are as worried as the sum of yourself and the
 difference between my small smooth hamster and my nose. Speak your
 mind!

Juliet:
 Speak YOUR mind! You are as bad as Hamlet! You are as small as the
 difference between the square of the difference between my little pony
 and your big hairy hound and the cube of your sorry little
 codpiece. Speak your mind!

[Exit Romeo]

                    Scene II: Juliet and Ophelia's conversation.

[Enter Ophelia]

Juliet:
 Thou art as good as the quotient between Romeo and the sum of a small
 furry animal and a leech. Speak your mind!

Ophelia:
 Thou art as disgusting as the quotient between Romeo and twice the
 difference between a mistletoe and an oozing infected blister! Speak
 your mind!

[Exeunt]

== See also ==
- Natural language programming
- Esoteric programming language
- Inform 7
- Timeline of programming languages
