= Xmouse =

System of computer mouse control

Xmouse is a system of mouse control in computer operating systems used instead of the standard selection behavior. The xmouse system automatically selects objects or activates windows after hovering the mouse over the object for a certain period of time.

== Description and comparison ==
Xmouse is a system of mouse control used instead of the standard system of selection on computers (most notably Windows and X11, where it is an option). The behavior is similar to mouse control in X Windows. Where normal Windows and X11 mouse control uses single-click for selection and double-click to open/edit/etc, the xmouse system automatically selects objects after hovering the mouse over the object for a certain period of time (often one second). Hovering over a window makes it the active window. The context function, previously activated by double-clicking, is activated by single-clicking; double-clicking is made redundant by this system and is ignored. Operation of menus, text selection, and other features remain unchanged.

== Availability ==
On Microsoft Windows, an Xmouse Control Panel applet was available as part of the Windows 95 PowerToys, used to configure focusing windows in the user interface by hovering. On newer Windows versions, the behavior can be configured using Tweak UI or directly from the Windows Registry. The setting is also built into Windows Vista and Windows 7 in the Ease of Access Center as "Activate a window by hovering over it with the mouse", however preventing the activated window from moving to foreground can be done by using the relevant SystemParametersInfo system calls in Windows' USER component, or by configuring the registry.

== Reception ==
Proponents of the xmouse system claim it has many advantages over the regular system of selection. Most notably, it requires much less effort on the part of the user to use the computer, and can be considerably faster once users have adjusted to the non-standard interface.

The two main disadvantages are the selection speed and being the non-standard. Firstly, if the activated window is also configured to be drawn into foreground there must be a minimum time for the cursor to hover over a window before it is selected, or else all touched windows would be immediately in foreground and cover other windows. This lag time reduces the maximum speed that xmouse can be used at, and could lead to annoying pauses. Secondly, as it is rarely used in the world, people who get used to the xmouse system might find it hard to adjust to using other computers, and vice versa.
