= IResQ =

American company

My Professional Edge, LLC dba iResQ
- Type: Private
- Industry: Technology Repair
- Founded: 1994
- Headquarters: Olathe, Kansas
- Area served: United States
- Number of employees: 25 (2025)
- Website: www.iresq.com

iResQ is a DBA of My Professional Edge, LLC, a computer and tablet company founded in 1994 and located in Olathe, Kansas. iResQ diagnoses and repairs all makes and models of computers, laptops, tablets and gaming devices, including Apple products, Windows devices and Microsoft, Sony and Nintendo game consoles. iResQ also sells accessories and parts in addition to its repair and upgrade services.

== Services ==
The company provides diagnostic and repair services for iPods, iPhones, iPads, MacBooks/MacBook Pros, Mac Minis, and PSPs. Battery recycling services are also available, and the company is an official rechargeable battery collection site in the Rechargeable Battery Recycling Corporation's Call2Recycle program. iResQ also buys used or broken iPods, iPhones, Mac portables, and Mac desktops for parts and refurbishing.

In February 2009, iResQ announced that it was partnering with a local recycling facility that redistributes surplus electronics to nonprofit organizations. It will also have its cardboard and paper waste processed.

== Previous names ==
The company was originally named “MacWorks” in 1994 and changed to ResQ Systems, LLC in 2001. By 2007, the names “iPodResQ,” “PowerBookResQ,” “InkResQ,” “PowerMacResQ,” and “MacBookResQ” were used for different divisions. In February 2007 the company announced the new name—iResQ—encompassing the various repair services under one brand.

== The Dead iPod Song ==
iResQ attracted some attention after sponsoring a video created by the Internet-based comedians and filmmakers Rhett and Link. The idea originated out of a contest when a fan responded to the website's “Submit-a-Song” program by asking the duo to produce a video about what to do with a dead iPod. The song was released in February 2008. Featuring a cameo by viral video comedian iJustine, it has received over 2 million views on YouTube as of April 2018.
