= ABSET =

Programming language

ABSET was an early declarative programming language from the University of Aberdeen.

== See also ==
- ABSYS

== Bibliography ==
- "ABSET: A Programming Language Based on Sets", E.W. Elcock et al., Mach Intell 4, Edinburgh U Press, 1969
