= Esoteric programming language =

Programming language for experimentation or art

An esoteric programming language (sometimes shortened to esolang) or weird language is a programming language designed to test the boundaries of computer programming language design as a proof of concept, as software art, as a hacking interface to another language (particularly functional programming or procedural programming languages), or as a joke. The use of the word esoteric distinguishes them from languages that working developers use to write software. The creators of most esolangs do not intend them to be used for mainstream programming, although some esoteric features, such as live visualization of code, have inspired practical applications in the arts. Such languages are often popular among hackers, hobbyists, and computer science academics.

Usability is rarely a goal for designers of esoteric programming languages; often their design leads to quite the opposite. Their usual aim is to remove or replace conventional language features while still maintaining a language that is Turing-complete, or even one for which the computational class is unknown.

== History ==
DO ,1 <- #13
PLEASE DO ,1 SUB #1 <- #238
DO ,1 SUB #2 <- #108
DO ,1 SUB #3 <- #112
DO ,1 SUB #4 <- #0
DO ,1 SUB #5 <- #64
DO ,1 SUB #6 <- #194
DO ,1 SUB #7 <- #48
PLEASE DO ,1 SUB #8 <- #22
DO ,1 SUB #9 <- #248
DO ,1 SUB #10 <- #168
DO ,1 SUB #11 <- #24
DO ,1 SUB #12 <- #16
DO ,1 SUB #13 <- #162
PLEASE READ OUT ,1
PLEASE GIVE UP

"Hello World!" program in C-INTERCAL

The earliest, and still the canonical example of an esoteric programming language, is INTERCAL, designed in 1972 by Don Woods and James M. Lyon, who said that their intention was to create a programming language unlike any with which they were familiar, namely FORTRAN, BASIC, COBOL, ALGOL, SNOBOL, SPITBOL, FOCAL, SOLVE, TEACH, APL, LISP, and PL/I. It parodied elements of established programming languages of the day.

For many years, INTERCAL was represented only by paper copies of the INTERCAL manual. Its revival in 1990 as an implementation in C under Unix stimulated a wave of interest in the intentional design of esoteric computer languages.

In 1993, Wouter van Oortmerssen created FALSE, a small stack-oriented programming language with syntax designed to make the code inherently obfuscated, confusing and unreadable. Its compiler is only 1024 bytes in size. This inspired Urban Müller to create an even smaller language, the now-infamous Brainfuck, which consists of only eight recognized characters. Along with Chris Pressey's Befunge (like FALSE, but with a two-dimensional instruction pointer), Brainfuck is now one of the best-supported esoteric programming languages, with canonical examples of minimal Turing tarpits and needlessly obfuscated language features. Brainfuck is related to the P′′ family of Turing machines.

== Common features ==
While esoteric programming languages differ in many ways, there are some common traits that characterize many languages, such as parody, minimalism, and the goal of making programming difficult. Many esoteric programming languages, such as Brainfuck and similar languages, use single characters as commands, however, it is not uncommon for languages to read line by line like conventional programming languages.

=== Unique data representations ===
Conventional imperative programming languages typically allow data to be stored in variables, but esoteric languages may utilize different methods of storing and accessing data. Languages like Brainfuck and Malbolge only permit data to be read through a single pointer, which must be moved to a location of interest before data is read. Others, like Befunge and Shakespeare, utilize one or more stacks to hold data, leading to a manner of execution akin to Reverse Polish notation. Finally, there are languages which explore alternative forms of number representation: the Brainfuck variant Boolfuck only permits operations on single bits, while Malbolge and INTERCAL variant TriINTERCAL replace bits altogether with a base 3 ternary system.

=== Unique instruction representations ===
Esoteric languages also showcase unique ways of representing program instructions. Some languages, such as Befunge and Piet, represent programs in two or more dimensions, with program control moving around in multiple possible directions through the program. This differs from conventional languages in which a program is a set of instructions usually encountered in sequence. Other languages modify instructions to appear in an unusual form, often one that can be read by humans with an alternate meaning to the underlying instructions. Shakespeare achieves this by making all programs resemble Shakespearean plays. Chef achieves the same by having all programs be recipes. Chef is particularly notable in that some have created programs that successfully function both as a program and as a recipe, demonstrating the ability of the language to produce a double meaning; this is called multicoding. Multicoding esolangs where the two readings of the code aesthetically impact each other have been compared to the constraint-based writing of the Oulipo movement.

=== Difficulty to read and write ===
Many esoteric programming languages are designed to produce code that is deeply obfuscated, making it difficult to read and to write. The purpose of this may be to provide an interesting puzzle or challenge for program writers: Malbolge for instance was explicitly designed to be challenging, and so it has features like self-modifying code and highly counterintuitive operations. On the other hand, some esoteric languages become difficult to write due to their other design choices. Brainfuck is committed to the idea of a minimalist instruction set, so even though its instructions are straightforward in principle, the code that arises is difficult for a human to read. INTERCAL's difficulty arises as a result of the choice to avoid operations used in any other programming language, which stems from its origin as a parody of other languages.

=== Parody and spoof ===
One of the aims of esoteric programming languages is to parody or spoof existing languages and trends in the field of programming. For instance, the first esoteric language INTERCAL began as a spoof of languages used in the 1960s, such as APL, Fortran, and COBOL. INTERCAL's rules appear to be the inverse of rules in these other languages. However, the subject of parody is not always another established programming language. Shakespeare can be viewed as spoofing the structure of Shakespearean plays, for instance. The language Ook! is a parody of Brainfuck, where Brainfuck's eight commands are replaced by various orangutan sounds like "Ook. Ook?"

== Examples ==
=== Befunge ===
Befunge allows the instruction pointer to roam in multiple dimensions through the code. For example, the following program displays "Hello World" by pushing the characters in reverse order onto the stack, then printing the characters in a loop which circulates clockwise through the instructions >, :, v, _, ,, and ^.

"dlroW olleH">:v
             ^,_@

There are many versions of Befunge, the most common being Befunge-93, named as such because of its release year.

=== Binary lambda calculus ===
Binary lambda calculus is designed from an algorithmic information theory perspective to allow for the densest possible code with the most minimal means, featuring a 29-byte self interpreter, a 21-byte prime number sieve, and a 112-byte Brainfuck interpreter.

=== Brainfuck ===
Brainfuck is designed for extreme minimalism and leads to obfuscated code, with programs containing only eight distinct characters. The following program outputs "Hello, world!":

++++++++++[>+++++++>++++++++++>+++<<<-]>++.>+.+++++++
 ..+++.>++.<<+++++++++++++++.>.+++.------.--------.>+.

All characters other than +-<>,.[] are ignored.

=== Chef ===
Chef is a stack-oriented programming language created by David Morgan-Mar in 2002, designed to make programs look like cooking recipes. Programs consist of a title, a list of variables and their data values, and a list of stack manipulation instructions. They can also contain comments, cooking time and oven temperature as an optional statements. A joking design principle states that "program recipes should not only generate valid output, but be easy to prepare and delicious", and Morgan-Mar notes that an example "Hello, World!" program with 101 eggs and 111 cups (~26,640 mL) oil would produce "a lot of food for one person".

This programming language features interpreters: a Perl interpreter written by Steffen Muller and a Java interpreter written by Wesley Janssen, Joost Rijneveld, and Mathijs Vos.

=== FRACTRAN ===
A FRACTRAN program is an ordered list of positive fractions together with an initial positive integer input $n$. The program is run by multiplying the integer $n$ by the first fraction $f$ in the list for which $nf$ is an integer. The integer $n$ is then replaced by $nf$ and the rule is repeated. If no fraction in the list produces an integer when multiplied by $n$, the program halts. FRACTRAN was invented by mathematician John Conway.

=== INTERCAL ===
INTERCAL, short for "Compiler Language With No Pronounceable Acronym", was created in 1972 as a parody to satirize aspects of the various programming languages at the time.

=== JSFuck ===
JSFuck is an esoteric programming style of JavaScript, where code is written using only six characters: [, ], (, ), !, and +. Unlike Brainfuck, which requires its own compiler or interpreter, JSFuck is valid JavaScript code, meaning JSFuck programs can be run in any web browser or engine that interprets JavaScript. It has been used in a number of cross-site scripting (XSS) attacks on websites such as eBay due to its ability to evade cross-site scripting detection filters.

=== LOLCODE ===
LOLCODE is designed to resemble the speech of lolcats. The following is the "Hello World" example:

HAI
CAN HAS STDIO?
VISIBLE "HAI WORLD!"
KTHXBYE

While the semantics of LOLCODE is not unusual, its syntax has been described as a linguistic phenomenon, representing an unusual example of informal speech and internet slang in programming.

=== Malbolge ===
Malbolge (named after the 8th circle of Hell) was designed to be the most difficult and esoteric programming language. Among other features, code is self-modifying by design and the effect of an instruction depends on its address in memory.

=== Piet ===
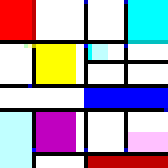
Piet program that prints 'Piet'

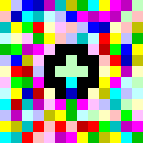
A "Hello World" program in Piet

Piet is a language designed by David Morgan-Mar, whose programs are bitmaps that look like abstract art. The execution is guided by a "pointer" that moves around the image, from one continuous coloured region to the next. Procedures are carried out when the pointer exits a region.

There are 20 colours for which behaviour is specified: 18 "colourful" colours, which are ordered by a 6-step hue cycle and a 3-step brightness cycle; and black and white, which are not ordered. When exiting a "colourful" colour and entering another one, the performed procedure is determined by the number of steps of change in hue and brightness. Black cannot be entered; when the pointer tries to enter a black region, the rules of choosing the next block are changed instead. If all possible rules are tried, the program terminates. Regions outside the borders of the image are also treated as black. White does not perform operations, but allows the pointer to "pass through". The behaviour of colours other than the 20 specified is left to the compiler or interpreter.

Variables are stored in memory as signed integers in a single stack. Most specified procedures deal with operations on that stack, while others deal with input/output and with the rules by which the compilation pointer moves.

Piet was named after the Dutch painter Piet Mondrian. The original intended name, Mondrian, was already taken by an open-source statistical data-visualization system.

=== Shakespeare ===
Shakespeare Programming Language (SPL) is designed to make programs look like Shakespearean plays. For example, the following statement declares a point in the program which can be reached via a GOTO-type statement:

 Act I: Hamlet's insults and flattery.

=== Unlambda ===
Unlambda is a minimalist functional programming language based on SKI calculus, but combined with first-class continuations and imperative I/O (with input usually requiring the use of continuations).

=== Velato ===
Velato was created by Daniel Temkin in 2009 and uses MIDI files as its source code. Programs are composed of musical notes, with each instruction determined by the interval between successive notes relative to a chosen root note. This design allows valid Velato code to double as a musical composition.

=== Whitespace ===
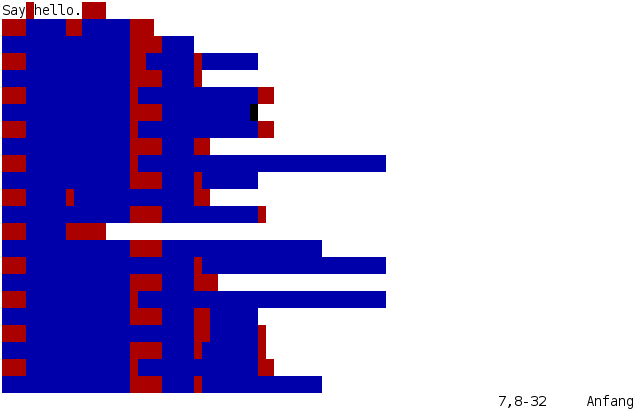
Whitespace hello world program with syntax highlighting tabs spaces

Whitespace uses only ASCII whitespace characters (space U+0020, tab U+0009, and linefeed U+000A), ignoring all other characters, which can therefore be used for comments. This is the reverse of many traditional languages, which do not distinguish between different whitespace characters, treating tab and space the same. It also allows Whitespace programs to be hidden in the source code of programs in languages like C.

== Cultural context ==
The cultural context of esolangs has been studied by Geoff Cox, who writes that esolangs "shift attention from command and control toward cultural expression and refusal", seeing esolangs as similar to code art and code poetry, such as Mez Breeze's mezangelle, a belief shared by others in field. Daniel Temkin claims that "esolangs are open-ended systems, natively collaborative, and distanced from any single materialized form", which "challenge or re-affirm wider ideas in programming culture and in how computer science is taught", including the neutral, "professional" style advocated in Edsgar Dijkstra's The Humble Programmer.

== Bibliography ==
- Paloque-Bergès, Camille (2009). "Langages ésotériques". Poétique des codes sur le réseau informatique. Archives contemporaines. ISBN 978-2-914610-70-4.
- Cox, Geoff (2013). Speaking Code: Coding as Aesthetic and Political Expression. MIT Press. ISBN 978-0-262-01836-4.
- Kneusel, Ronald (2022). Strange Code: Esoteric Languages That Make Programming Fun Again. No Starch Press. ISBN 978-1718502406.
