= Irreversible circuit =

In the study of reversible computing, an irreversible circuit is a circuit whose inputs cannot be reconstructed from its outputs. Such a circuit, of necessity, consumes energy. More precisely, there is a lower bound derived from quantum physics on the minimum amount of energy needed for each computation with such a circuit. In contrast, reversible circuits can, theoretically, be designed to operate on arbitrarily small amounts of energy.

Any irreversible circuit can be simulated by a reversible circuit that is padded with additional outputs.

== See also ==
- Reversible computing
