= Absys =

- Paradigm: Logic programming
- First appeared: 1967

Influenced
- Prolog

Absys was an early declarative programming language from the University of Aberdeen. It anticipated a number of features of Prolog such as negation as failure, aggregation operators, the central role of backtracking and constraint solving. Absys was the first implementation of a logic programming language.

The name Absys was chosen as an abbreviation for Aberdeen System.

== See also ==
- ABSET
