= Whitespace (programming language) =

Esoteric programming language

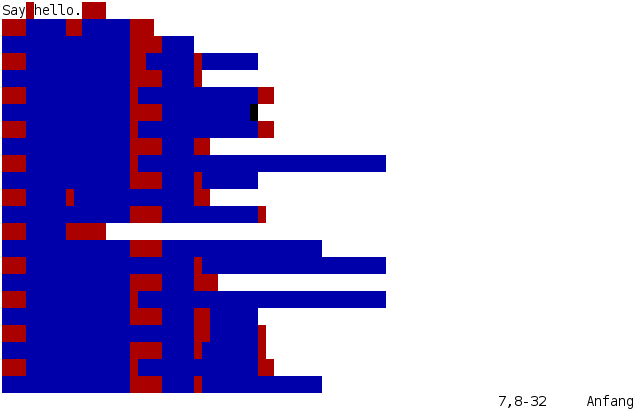
Whitespace hello world program with syntax highlighting tabs spaces

Whitespace is an esoteric programming language with syntax where only whitespace characters (space, tab and newline) have meaning – contrasting typical languages that largely ignore whitespace characters.

As a consequence of its syntax, Whitespace source code can be contained within the whitespace of code written in a language that ignores whitespace – making the text a polyglot.

Whitespace is an imperative, stack-based language. The programmer can push arbitrary-width integer values onto a stack and access a heap to store data.

An interpreter, along with its Haskell source code, is provided by the Whitespace creators.

== History ==
Edwin Brady and Chris Morris, who also developed the Kaya and Idris languages, created Whitespace in 2002 at the University of Durham. Slashdot published a review on April Fool's Day 2003.

The idea of using whitespace characters as operators for the C++ language had been facetiously suggested five years earlier by Bjarne Stroustrup.

== Syntax ==
Whitespace defines a command as a sequence of whitespace characters. For example, [tab][space][space][space] performs arithmetic addition of the top two elements on the stack.

A command is written as an instruction modification parameter (IMP) followed by an operation and then any parameters.

IMP sequences include:

IMP	Meaning
[space]	stack manipulation
[tab][space]	arithmetic
[tab][tab]	heap access
[linefeed]	flow control
[tab][linefeed]	I/O

Operator sequences, organized by IMP, include:

IMP	Operator	Parameter	Meaning	Minimum size of the stack required*
[space]	[space]	number	Push the number onto the stack	0
[space]	[LF][space]	—	Duplicate the top item on the stack	1
[space]	[tab][space]	number n	Copy the nth item on the stack (given by the argument) onto the top of the stack**	n + 1
[space]	[LF][tab]	—	Swap the top two items on the stack	2
[space]	[LF][LF]	—	Discard the top item on the stack	1
[space]	[tab][LF]	number n	Slide n items off the stack, keeping the top item**	may be less than n + 1, but at least 1 item (top of the stack) is required
[tab][space]	[space][space]	—	Addition	2
[tab][space]	[space][tab]	—	Subtraction	2
[tab][space]	[space][LF]	—	Multiplication	2
[tab][space]	[tab][space]	—	Integer division	2 (top may not be 0)
[tab][space]	[tab][tab]	—	Modulo	2 (top may not be 0)
[tab][tab]	[space]	—	Store in heap	2
[tab][tab]	[tab]	—	Retrieve from heap	1
[LF]	[space][space]	label	Mark a location in the program	0
[LF]	[space][tab]	label	Call a subroutine	0
[LF]	[space][LF]	label	Jump to a label	0
[LF]	[tab][space]	label	Jump to a label if the top of the stack is zero	1
[LF]	[tab][tab]	label	Jump to a label if the top of the stack is negative	1
[LF]	[tab][LF]	—	End a subroutine and transfer control back to the caller	0 (callstack: 1)
[LF]	[LF][LF]	—	End the program	0
[tab][LF]	[space][space]	—	Output the character at the top of the stack	1
[tab][LF]	[space][tab]	—	Output the number at the top of the stack	1
[tab][LF]	[tab][space]	—	Read a character and place it in the location given by the top of the stack	1
[tab][LF]	[tab][tab]	—	Read a number and place it in the location given by the top of the stack	1

* Due to Haskell being lazily evaluated, the effect of the stack being too small may only show when, for example, invoking the outputting a number side-effect.

** The copy and slide operations were added in Whitespace 0.3.

=== Comments ===
Characters other than space, tab and linefeed are ignored and thus can be used for comments.

=== Numbers ===
A numeric value is represented as a sequence of space and tab characters that represent 0 and 1 respectively and terminated by a linefeed. The first character represents the sign of the value – space for positive and tab for negative. Subsequent characters before the terminator represent the binary digits of a value.

For example:

- [space][tab][space][space][tab][space][tab][tab][linefeed] (STSSTSTTL) is positive since it starts with space and represents 1001011 in binary, which is 75 in decimal.
- [tab][tab][tab][space][space][tab][space][linefeed] (TTTSSTSL) is negative since it starts with tab and represents −110010 in binary, which is −50 in decimal.

=== Labels ===
A label is used for control flow. It is a linefeed-terminated sequence of spaceand tab characters. As there is only one namespace, all labels must be unique.

== Sample code ==
The following source code is for a Whitespace "Hello, world!" program. For clarity, it is annotated with S, T and L before each space, tab, and linefeed.

S S S T	S S T	S S S L:Push_+1001000=72='H'_onto_the_stack
T	L
S S :Output_'H';_S S S T	T	S S T	S T	L:Push_+1100101=101='e'_onto_the_stack
T	L
S S :Output_'e';_S S S T	T	S T	T	S S L:+1101100=108='l'
T	L
S S S S S T	T	S T	T	S S L:+1101100=108='l'
T	L
S S S S S T	T	S T	T	T	T	L:+1101111=111='o'
T	L
S S S S S T	S T	T	S S L:+101100=44=','
T	L
S S S S S T	S S S S S L:+100000=32=Space
T	L
S S S S S T	T	T	S T	T	T	L:+1110111=119='w'
T	L
S S S S S T	T	S T	T	T	T	L:+1101111=111='o'
T	L
S S S S S T	T	T	S S T	S L:+1110010=114='r'
T	L
S S S S S T	T	S T	T	S S L:+1101100=108='l'
T	L
S S S S S T	T	S S T	S S L=+1100100=100='d'
T	L
S S S S S T	S S S S T	L:+100001=33='!'
T	L
S S :Output_'!';_L
L
L:End_the_program

When Whitespace source code is displayed in some browsers, the horizontal spacing produced by a tab character is not fixed, but depends on its location in the text relative to the next horizontal tab stop. Depending on the software, tab characters may also get replaced by the corresponding variable number of space characters.
