= UB =

UB or Ub may refer to:

== Organizations ==
- Basel University Library, German: Bibliothek der Universität Basel, abbreviated UB.
- UltimateBet, a defunct online poker site
- Ungermann-Bass, a computer networking company in California
- United Biscuits, a British and European food manufacturer
- United Breweries Group, a brewery conglomerate in India
- Urząd Bezpieczeństwa (1945–1954), part of the Polish secret police
- Church of the United Brethren in Christ, also known as the United Brethren
- Myanmar National Airlines, IATA code UB
- Urban Behavior, defunct Canadian retailer

== Places ==
- Ub, Serbia, a town in Serbia
- Ub (river), a river in Serbia
- UB postcode area, in London, England
- Ulaanbaatar (Ulan Bator), Mongolia

== Universities ==
- University of Bridgeport, Connecticut, US
- Bakrie University, Jakarta, Indonesia
- Brawijaya University, Malang, Indonesia
- University at Buffalo, New York, US
- University of Baguio, Philippines
- University of the Bahamas
- University of Ballarat, Victoria, Australia
- University of Baltimore, Maryland, US
- University of Barcelona, Catalonia, Spain
- University of Basrah, Iraq
- University of Batangas, Philippines
- University of Belgrade, Serbia
- University of Belgrano, Argentina
- University of Birmingham, UK
- University of Bohol, Philippines
- University of Botswana
- University of Brawijaya, Malang, Indonesia
- University of Bucharest, Bucharest, Romania
- University of Buckingham, Buckinghamshire, UK
- University of Buea, Buea, Cameroon
- University of Burgundy, France

== Science and technology ==
- Berezin UB, a Soviet World War II machine gun
- Ubiquitin, a small regulatory protein
- Undefined behavior, in computer science, operations that are unspecified
- Unexpected bilingualism, a form of language acquisition in autistic people
- Universal Beam, a type of I-beam
- Upper bound, a mathematical concept in order theory

== Other uses ==
- Ub Iwerks (1901–1971), American animator and cartoonist
- Ugly Betty, an American drama-comedy television series
- German submarine UB, German name for the captured British submarine HMS Seal (N37)
- German Type UB submarine
- Upward Bound, a United States Department of Education-sponsored program
- The Urantia Book, a spiritual and philosophical book published in 1955
- U.S.C. de Bananier, Guadeloupean football club in Capesterre-Belle-Eau
- U.S. Bitonto, an Italian association football club in Bitonto, Apulia

== See also ==
- U of B (disambiguation)
- UBS (disambiguation)
- Ubo (disambiguation)
- Ubu (disambiguation)
- OOB (disambiguation)
