= UBS (disambiguation) =

UBS is a bank and financial services company headquartered in Zurich, Switzerland.

UBS or Ubs may also refer to:

== Groups, organizations, companies ==
- Ulaanbaatar Broadcasting System, a national television channel in Mongolia
- Umeå Business School, Umeå University, Sweden
- Union Bank of Switzerland, the predecessor of UBS, prior to its merger with Swiss Bank Corporation
- Universal Business School, Karjat, Mumbai, India
- Union Biblical Seminary, theological seminary in Pune, India
- United Bible Societies, a global association of Bible publishers
- United Blood Services, a non-profit blood services organization in the western United States
- United Building Society, the name of several financial institutions in various countries
- Ultrasonic Broadcasting System, a Philippines radio network

=== Fictional ===
- Union Broadcasting System, a fictional television network in the 1976 film Network

== Other uses ==
- UBS Arena, a multi-purpose indoor arena in New York
- UBS machine gun, a variant of the Berezin UB 12.7 mm (0.500 in) machine gun
- UBS tax evasion controversy, alleged multibillion-dollar tax evasion case involving UBS
- United Belgian States, a confederation in the southern Netherlands in 1790
- Universal basic services, a form of social security
- Unbundled Bitstream Service, a broadband Internet service in New Zealand
- Unbiseptium, a hypothetical chemical element with symbol Ubs
- The Great Seljuks: Guardians of Justice, a Turkish television series, also known as Uyanış: Büyük Selçuklu (UBS)

== See also ==
- USB (disambiguation)
- UB (disambiguation), for the singular of UBs
