= Cal Ripken Jr. =

American baseball player (born 1960)

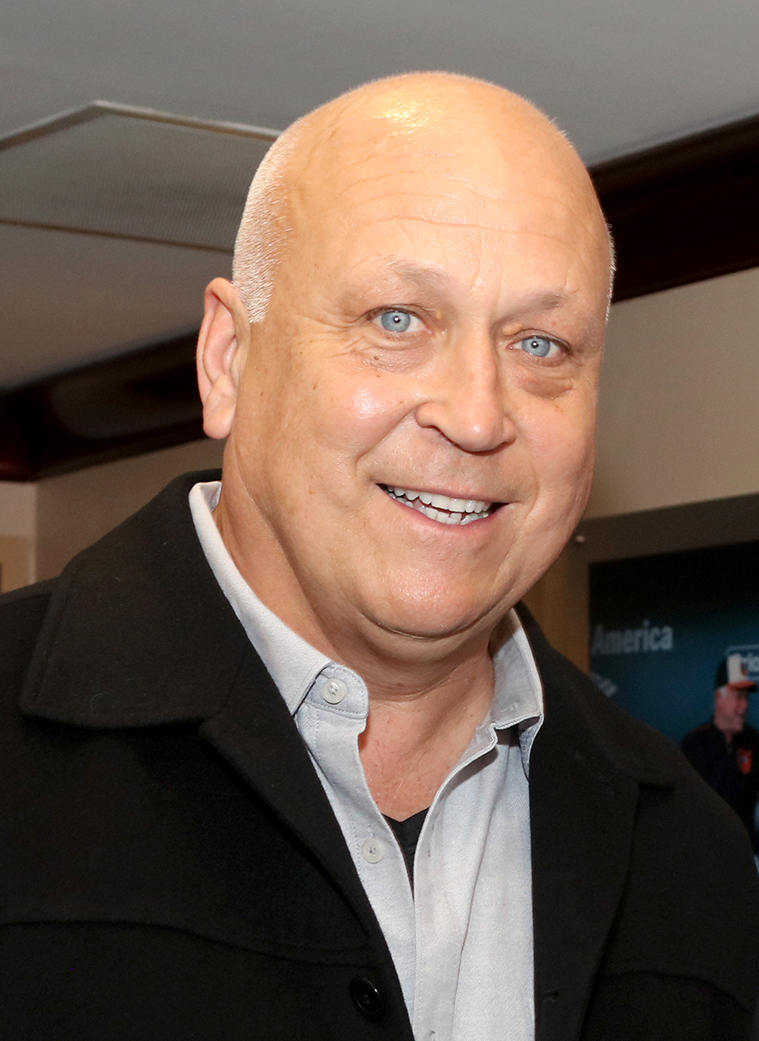
- Ripken in 2019
- Shortstop / Third baseman
- Born: August 24, 1960 (age 66); Havre de Grace, Maryland, U.S.
- Batted: Right Threw: Right

MLB debut
- August 10, 1981, for the Baltimore Orioles

Last MLB appearance
- October 6, 2001, for the Baltimore Orioles

MLB statistics
- Batting average: .276
- Hits: 3,184
- Home runs: 431
- Runs batted in: 1,695
- Stats at Baseball Reference

Teams
- Baltimore Orioles (1981–2001)

Career highlights and awards
- 19× All-Star (1983–2001); World Series champion (1983); 2× AL MVP (1983, 1991); AL Rookie of the Year (1982); 2× Gold Glove Award (1991, 1992); 8× Silver Slugger Award (1983–1986, 1989, 1991, 1993, 1994); Roberto Clemente Award (1992); MLB record 2,632 consecutive games played; Commissioner's Historic Achievement Award; Baltimore Orioles No. 8 retired; Baltimore Orioles Hall of Fame; Major League Baseball All-Century Team

Member of the National

Baseball Hall of Fame
- Induction: 2007
- Vote: 98.5% (first ballot)

Calvin Edwin Ripken Jr. (born August 24, 1960), nicknamed "the Iron Man", is an American former professional baseball shortstop and third baseman who played his entire 21-season career in Major League Baseball (MLB) for the Baltimore Orioles (1981–2001). One of his position's most productive offensive players, Ripken compiled 3,184 hits, 431 home runs, 1,695 runs batted in, and won two Gold Glove Awards for his defense during his career. He was a 19-time All-Star and was twice named American League (AL) Most Valuable Player (MVP), in 1983 and 1991.

Ripken holds the record for consecutive games played (2,632), having surpassed Lou Gehrig's streak of 2,130 which had stood for 56 years and which many deemed was unbreakable. In 2007, he was elected to the Baseball Hall of Fame in his first year of eligibility with 98.53% of votes, the sixth-highest election percentage ever to-date.

Born in Maryland, Ripken grew up traveling around the United States as his father, Cal Sr., was a player and coach in the Orioles' organization. After playing at Aberdeen High School, Ripken Jr. was drafted by the Orioles in the second round of the 1978 MLB draft. He reached the major leagues in 1981 as a shortstop but moved to third base in 1982, but the following year, he was shifted back to shortstop, his long-time position for Baltimore. That year, Ripken also won the AL Rookie of the Year Award and began his consecutive games played streak.

In 1983, he won a World Series championship over the Philadelphia Phillies and his first AL MVP Award. One of Ripken's best years came in 1991 when he was named an All-Star, won the Home Run Derby, and was the recipient of his first All-Star Game MVP Award, his second AL MVP Award, and first Gold Glove Award. He broke the consecutive games played record on September 6, 1995, in his 2,131st consecutive game, which fans voted as the league's "most memorable moment" in the history of the game in an MLB.com poll; Ripken voluntarily ended his 17-year streak at 2,632 games before the final home game of the 1998 season. He switched back to third base for the final five years of his career. In 2001, his final season, Ripken was named the All-Star Game MVP and was honored with the Commissioner's Historic Achievement Award.

Ripken is considered one of the best shortstops in baseball history. At 6 ft 4 in (1.93 m), 225 lb (102 kg), he pioneered the way for the success of taller, larger shortstops. He holds the record for most home runs hit as a shortstop, at 345, breaking the record of 298 previously held by Ernie Banks, and was selected as the starting shortstop for the Major League Baseball All-Century Team.

Ripken is a best-selling author and the president and CEO of Ripken Baseball, Inc., whose goal is to expand the love of baseball from a grassroots level. Since his retirement, he has purchased three minor league baseball teams, and a minority stake with the Orioles. He has been active in charity work throughout his career and is still considered an ambassador of the game. He lives in Annapolis, Maryland, and is married to Laura Ripken, née Kiessling, a judge on the Appellate Court of Maryland.

== Early life ==
Calvin Edwin Ripken Jr. was born on August 24, 1960, in Havre de Grace, Maryland, the son of Violet Roberta "Vi" Ripken (née Gross) and Cal Ripken Sr. He has German, English, and Irish ancestry. Though the Ripkens called Aberdeen, Maryland, their home, they were often on the move because of Cal Sr.'s coaching duties with the Baltimore Orioles organization. Cal Sr., in fact, was in Topeka, Kansas, with one of his teams when his son was born.

Cal Jr. grew up around baseball and got started in it at a very young age. He was able to receive instruction from players on his father's teams, most notably from Doug DeCinces. He also got advice from his father, who once remarked to his mother that his questions were better than the ones reporters had. At the age of three, Ripken knew he wanted to be a ballplayer, and at the age of 10, Ripken "knew the game inside and out". Ripken and his brother Billy attended Aberdeen High School. They both played baseball there; Cal also played soccer. He has two other siblings, Ellen and Fred.

Ripken began his high school career playing second base; his coach, Don Morrison, said, "I was considering moving him to short, but I was unsure if his arm was strong enough." Despite Morrison's concerns, Ripken did move to shortstop as a sophomore, combining strong fielding with a team-leading 10 runs batted in (RBI).

Needing pitching help, the Aberdeen Eagles began using Ripken as a pitcher as well in his junior year. He responded by striking out 55 batters in 46 1/3 innings pitched with three shutouts while batting .339 with 21 hits and nine RBIs. He was named the Harford County Most Valuable Player (MVP) while helping Aberdeen become county champions for the first time since 1959. During his senior year, Ripken again had a strong season, lifting his batting average to .688 at one point and posting a 0.79 ERA with 45 strikeouts over his first 26 innings. In the playoffs, Ripken pitched the state championship game against Thomas Stone High School.

The Eagles trailed 3–1 when Ripken, noting that rain was coming and that the game would be canceled and replayed because the Eagles had not yet played the fourth inning, made nine throws to first base to ensure the game would be replayed. When the game was played the next week, Ripken struck out 17, allowed two hits, and threw a complete game as Aberdeen won the state championship. He threw 102 pitches in the 7–1 victory.

== Professional career ==
=== Draft and minor leagues ===
The Baltimore Orioles drafted Ripken in the second round of the 1978 Major League Baseball draft 48th overall. Despite a story written by SABR, Ripken was selected with the Orioles' predetermined draft pick, not through a forfeited pick from the Boston Red Sox after the Sox selected Dick Drago in the 1977 re-entry draft. The Orioles would select catcher Cecil Whitehead with the pick they received from Boston two picks after Ripken.

On deciding to go straight from high school to the professional level, he said, "When the colleges started coming around, Dad and I talked about mostly whether I was going to pursue a career in baseball. If I had the ability, the feeling was to get on with it, and if it didn't work out, start over again in college at 25 or 26." Ripken played both pitcher and shortstop in high school; in fact, the Orioles were the only team not just interested in his pitching ability. The Orioles decided to start him playing shortstop in the minor leagues, deciding it would be easier for him to transition back to pitching if necessary than it would be for him to start hitting again.

In 1978, to begin Ripken's minor league career, the Orioles assigned him to the Bluefield Orioles of the rookie Appalachian League. He batted .264 with 63 hits, no home runs, and 24 RBIs, failing to make the league's all-rookie team.

In 1979, Ripken moved up to the Single-A Miami Orioles of the Florida State League. Shortly into the season, Miami manager Lance Nichols decided to move Ripken to third base, saying, "Cal was having some problems at short, so naturally I decided to shift him to third ... Third base was a perfect fit for Cal and our team." On July 2, Ripken hit his first professional home run, a game-winner in the 12th inning against Joseph Abone of the West Palm Beach Expos.

Ripken batted .303, hit five home runs, led the league with 28 doubles, and had 54 RBIs while playing in all 105 of Miami's games. He was named an All-Star after the season. His performance earned him a brief call-up to the Charlotte Orioles of the Double-A Southern League; Ripken batted .180 in a month with them, albeit with three home runs.

Ripken began 1980 with Charlotte. His manager at Charlotte, Jimmy Williams, predicted him to set the team home run record, and Ripken did not disappoint. At season's end, he had 25 home runs, besting the previous record by four. He also had 28 doubles, 78 RBIs, and a .492 slugging percentage. Ripken was named an All-Star while helping Charlotte win the Southern League championship.

In 1981, Ripken was added to Baltimore's 40-man roster. He attended spring training with the Orioles, but was sent to the Rochester Red Wings of the Triple-A International League to start the season. At Rochester, Ripken played in the longest professional baseball game. Ripken started at third base and played all 33 innings against the Pawtucket Red Sox (which featured another future Hall of Famer, Wade Boggs) in a game that took parts of three days to complete. Ripken hit 23 home runs for Rochester while batting .288 with 75 RBIs in 114 games. He was named the International League Rookie of the Year.

=== Baltimore Orioles (1981–2001) ===
==== 1981–1986 ====
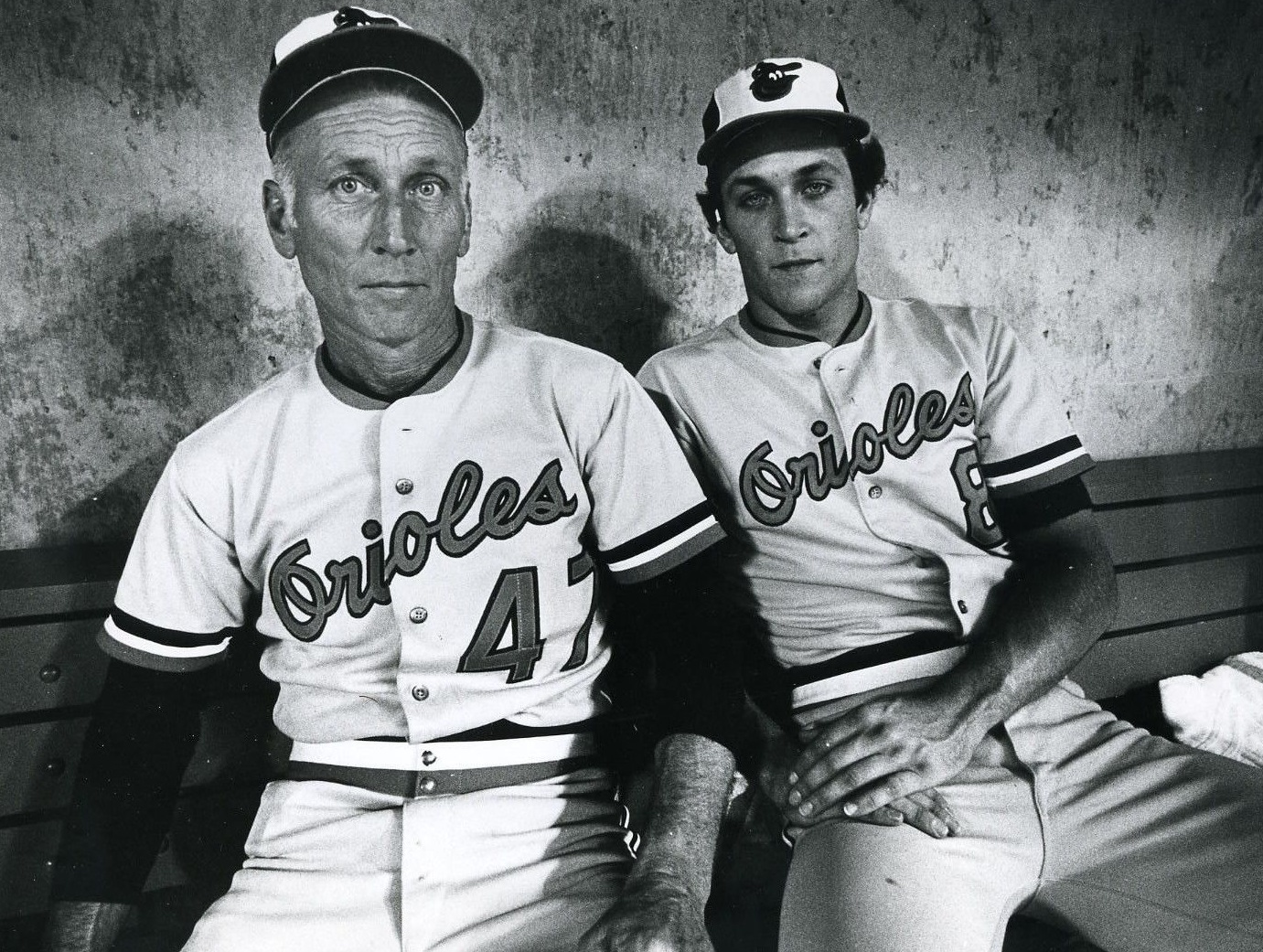
Cal Ripken Sr. and Jr. in 1982

The Orioles were planning to keep Ripken in Rochester through 1981, but searching for improvement in the second half of the 1981 season, they called him up on August 7. Manager Earl Weaver planned to have Ripken take over the role of utility infielder, in place of Wayne Krenchicki, who had been sent down to make room for Ripken on the roster. He made his debut on August 10 as a pinch runner for Ken Singleton in the 12th inning of a game against the Kansas City Royals. Ripken scored on a hit by John Lowenstein, giving the Orioles the win. His first major league hit came six days later against Dennis Lamp of the Chicago White Sox. Ripken finished the season batting .182 without an extra-base hit as the Orioles finished fourth in the second half of the season.

Ripken received the third base job for the Orioles in 1982 when the team traded DeCinces before the start of the season. He homered in his very first at-bat of the first game of the Orioles' 1982 season against Dennis Leonard of Kansas City as part of a three-hit outing. However, he slumped to begin the season; his batting average was .118 through May 1. Ripken looked for advice from several Orioles players and coaches but was most aided by advice from Reggie Jackson: "Just know what you know you can do, not what everybody else tells you to do."

After that, Ripken hit well for the rest of the season. On May 29, Ripken did not play the second game of a doubleheader, the last time he missed a game until 1998. On July 1, Weaver decided to permanently shift Ripken to shortstop, deciding that it was harder to find a shortstop who could hit than it was to find a third baseman who could hit. Weaver said, "You never know. Rip might be a great shortstop." Ripken hit 28 home runs that year en route to winning the American League (AL) Rookie of the Year Award. Aided by Ripken, the Orioles contended for the playoffs until they lost to the Milwaukee Brewers on the final day of the season.

Ripken advanced even more in 1983, having what would be one of the best years of his career. He played well all season on the way to earning the first of 19 All-Star berths. Roommate Rick Dempsey gave this analysis of Ripken's performance: "Certainly there were pitchers who faced him in 1982 and made or tried to make adjustments against him. But Cal was determined and worked hard to offset their adjustments." At season's end, Ripken had set Orioles' records for RBIs by a shortstop (102) and hits by all players (211). He led the major leagues in hits and doubles (47) while also leading the AL with 121 runs scored. As a shortstop, he led the league in fielding percentage (.970), assists (534), and double plays (111), although he did not win the Gold Glove Award. After the season, he was named the AL Most Valuable Player (MVP), hitting .318 with 27 home runs. Ripken became the first player in MLB history to win Rookie of the Year and MVP Awards in consecutive seasons.

Ripken made the playoffs for the first time as the Orioles won the AL East in 1983. The Orioles defeated the White Sox in the ALCS before beating the Philadelphia Phillies four games to one in the 1983 World Series. In the series, Ripken hit just .167 with no homers and only one RBI. Although not contributing significantly in the World Series with his bat, he made a number of key plays defensively at shortstop, including the final out of the series on a Garry Maddox lineout in Game 5. Before the 1984 season, Ripken signed a four-year contract for "about" $1 million a year, the largest contract the Orioles had ever given to a player of his age. Again, he was named to the All-Star Game.

He racked up another fine season, batting .304 with 27 home runs, 86 RBIs, and 103 runs scored. Although he failed to win a Gold Glove, he set an AL record with 583 assists. The Orioles had a winning record but only managed to finish in fifth place. Ripken's streak nearly came to an end in 1985. Against the Texas Rangers in the second game of the season, he sprained his ankle on a fielding play. Ripken finished the game, but afterward, Dr. Charles Silverstein ordered him to rest for 24 hours. However, the Orioles had an off day after that game, and Ripken was back for their next game. During the season, Ripken was managed by his father when Cal Sr. filled in between Joe Altobelli and Weaver for one game on June 14. Ripken finished the year batting .282 with 26 home runs and 110 RBIs while also leading the league with 123 double plays and 286 putouts.

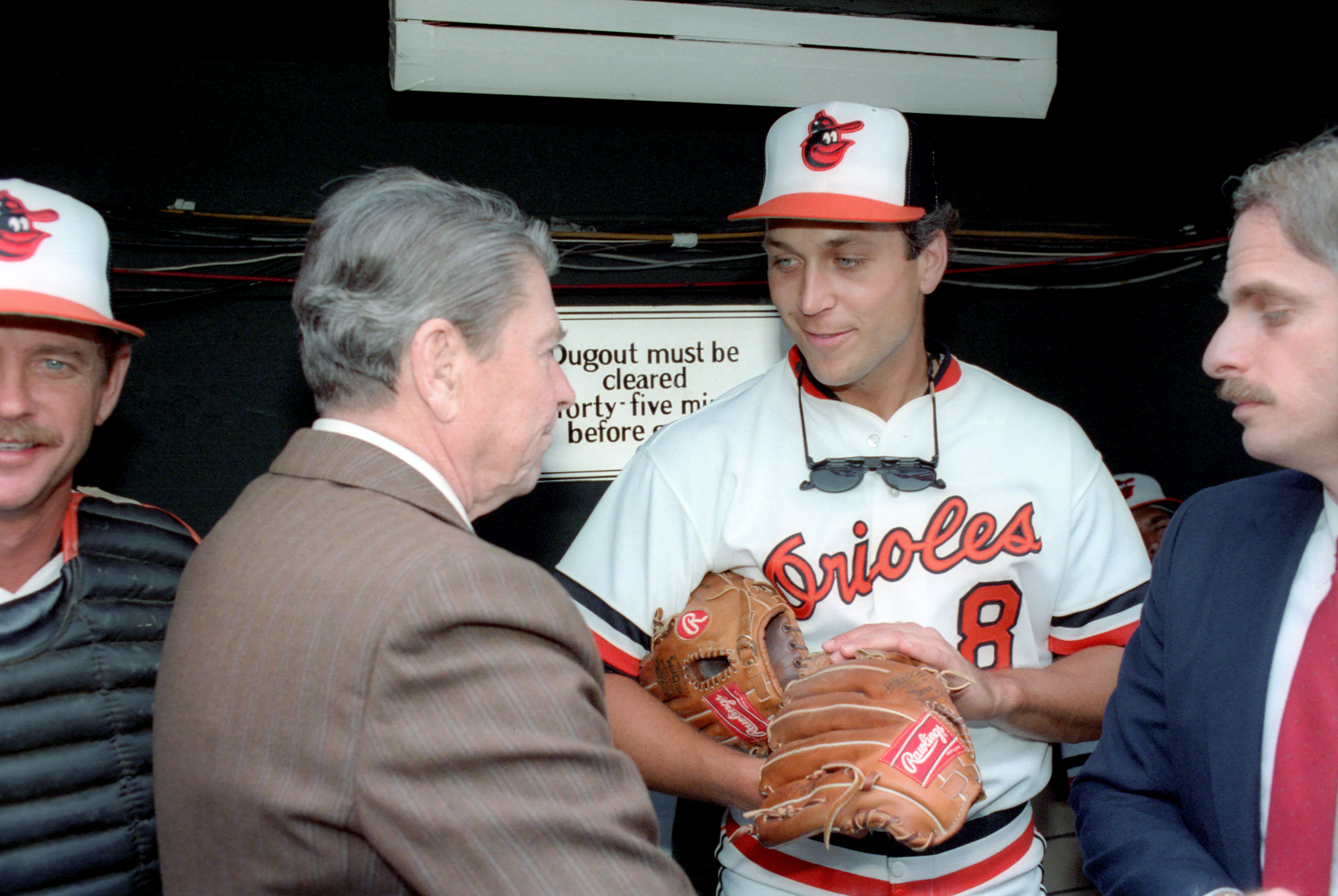
Ripken with President Ronald Reagan in 1986

During June 1986, Ripken recorded a 17-game hitting streak. It was a tough season for the Orioles, as they finished last for the first time in their tenure in Baltimore. In a speech to the team before the All-Star break, Weaver criticized the healthy players on the team for not hitting, except Ripken. "Do you know the kid hasn't missed an infield practice all year? Now, he's going to the All-Star Game," Weaver said. He batted .282 with 81 RBIs, a drop partly because the Orioles scored 110 fewer runs than the year before. He was the first Oriole other than Eddie Murray since 1979 to lead the team in home runs, with 25.

==== 1987–1990 ====
Cal Ripken Sr. replaced the retired Weaver as manager of the Orioles at the beginning of the 1987 season. That year, Ripken Sr. became the first manager to write two of his sons into the lineup card when both Ripken Jr. and his brother and fellow Oriole, Billy Ripken, played in the same game on July 11. Later in the season, Ripken Sr. decided to take Ripken Jr. out of the game on September 14, in a blow-out loss to the Toronto Blue Jays at Exhibition Stadium. Ron Washington replaced him in the eighth inning, ending Ripken's streak of 8,243 consecutive innings played. Ripken Sr. called the streak a "burden" after the game, saying, "I had to do it sometime." Consecutive innings streaks have not always been recorded, but Ripken's remains unchallenged by historians. Ripken finished the year batting a career-low .252, but he still hit 27 home runs, had 98 RBIs, and walked a career-high 81 times. He also recorded a .982 fielding percentage.

The Orioles considered having Ripken replace Ray Knight at third base in 1988, but they decided to keep him at shortstop. After the Orioles started the season 0–6, Ripken Sr. was fired and replaced by Frank Robinson. The Orioles started the year 0–21, with Ripken slumping as well to open the season. He finished the year batting just .264, although he led major league shortstops with 23 home runs and 81 RBIs. He also had a particularly memorable play in the All-Star Game, making a tremendous catch and strong throw to retire Will Clark in the second inning. Ken Rosenthal of The Baltimore Sun called it "the gem of the evening."

During the 1988 season, Ripken had signed a three-year contract with an option for a fourth year, preventing him from being a free agent at season's end. On August 2, 1989, he and Billy combined for seven hits against the Boston Red Sox, with Cal Jr. providing a game-winning hit late in the game. That was an AL record for hits by brothers; the major league record was held by Lloyd and Paul Waner, who had eight on June 25, 1932. Fifteen days later, he passed Steve Garvey by playing in his 1,208th straight game, moving to third on baseball's all-time list behind Lou Gehrig and Everett Scott. Despite this accomplishment, Ray Robinson of The New York Times wrote, "Few regarded Ripken... or anyone else, as the successor to the Iron Horse." The Orioles, after posting three straight losing seasons, contended for the playoffs most of the year before missing out in the final week of the season. Ripken slumped in September, as he had only seven hits in his final 55 at bats. He batted .257 in 1989 but was especially impressive for his fielding; he once went 47 games in a row without an error and finished the year with a .990 fielding percentage.

Ripken slumped offensively in 1990, batting .209 through his first 59 games. However, throughout the year, he impressed players and fans with his fielding. On June 12, he broke Mark Belanger's Baltimore record for most consecutive errorless chances by a shortstop. He went 67 straight games before experiencing what was originally scored an error on June 26. However, official scorer Bill Steka decided the error was really Mike Devereaux's fault and changed the call the next day. Ripken continued the streak to 95 games, breaking the Major League record for shortstops and setting the AL record for infielders other than third basemen. On June 12, he also passed Scott to move into second place all-time for consecutive games played. The milestone came at Memorial Stadium; however, the fans booed him because of his offensive slump. Ripken finished the year batting .250, leading the Orioles with 21 home runs, 84 RBIs, 150 hits, and 78 runs scored. He and Billy tied for the team lead with 28 doubles. Ripken committed only three errors in 1990, shattering the previous record of six in a season. Despite his fielding accomplishments, Ozzie Guillén, who had committed 17 errors, won the Gold Glove Award. Some felt that Ripken should have won the award: Tim Kurkjian called the vote a "crime", and Bobby Valentine stated that he was, "embarrassed by the actions of my peers."

==== 1991–1995 ====
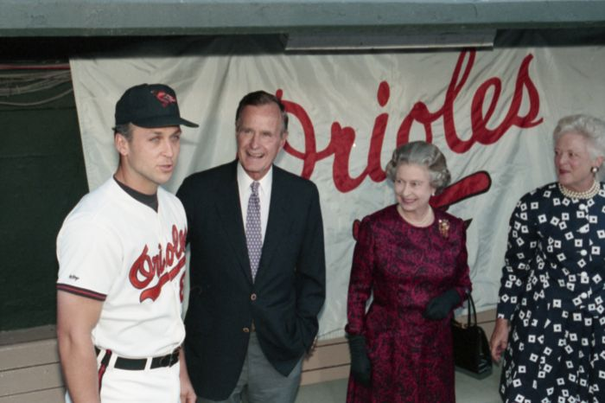
Ripken (left) with President George H. W. Bush, Elizabeth II and Barbara Bush in 1991

Ripken had a career year in 1991. Through the All-Star break, his batting average was .348, making him the first shortstop to be leading the league in average through that point since Lou Boudreau in 1947. He finished the season by hitting .323 with a career-high 34 home runs and 114 RBIs. In addition, Ripken hit 46 doubles, stole a career-high six bases, and hit five triples while posting his career lowest strikeout rate and fewest strikeouts in a season with 600 or more plate appearances. He became the first Major League shortstop ever to tally 30 home runs and 200 or more hits or 30 home runs and 40 or more doubles.

Ripken won his second AL MVP award, his first Gold Glove Award, the All-Star Game MVP Award (going two for three including a three-run home run off Dennis Martínez), the Gatorade Home Run Derby contest (hitting a then-record 12 home runs in 22 swings, including seven consecutive homers to start the contest), Louisville Slugger "Silver Slugger Award", Associated Press (AP) Player of the Year Award, and The Sporting News Player of the Year Award. The only other player in MLB history to win all those awards in the same season, excluding the Home Run Derby, was Maury Wills in 1962.

Ripken's home run off of former Orioles and then Montreal Expos pitcher Dennis Martínez was the defining moment of American League's 4–2 victory in the 1991 Major League Baseball All-Star Game. As a result, Ripken was the first player to win both the Home Run Derby and All-Star Game MVP Award in the same year. As for his regular-season MVP award, he was the first to win the award in the American League while playing with a sub-.500 club; the Orioles finished in sixth place that year with a 67–95 record. Ripken was only the second player to be named league MVP on a team with a losing record; Andre Dawson was the first in 1987, winning the NL MVP with the last-place Chicago Cubs.

At the end of the 1991 season, Memorial Stadium, the Orioles' home since 1954, saw its last MLB game against the Tigers. Ripken was the last Oriole to bat at the stadium, hitting into a double play against Detroit's Frank Tanana on October 6, 1991.

During the 1992 season, Ripken and the Orioles tried to work out a new contract. Several times throughout the season, Ripken endured batting slumps. He said after the season, "I don't like to make excuses for the fact that I wasn't hitting, but I was distracted ... I just felt like the Orioles were playing mind games with me. Whether that was right or wrong, it was bothering me." On August 22, Ripken finally signed a five-year, $30.5 million contract, the largest in baseball history at the time. Ripken's slumps continued, and he was even booed by Orioles fans late in the season. He finished the year batting .251 with career-lows in home runs (14) and RBIs (72). The Orioles contended for the playoffs much of the year, and were not eliminated until September 27. However, he did win his second Gold Glove Award.

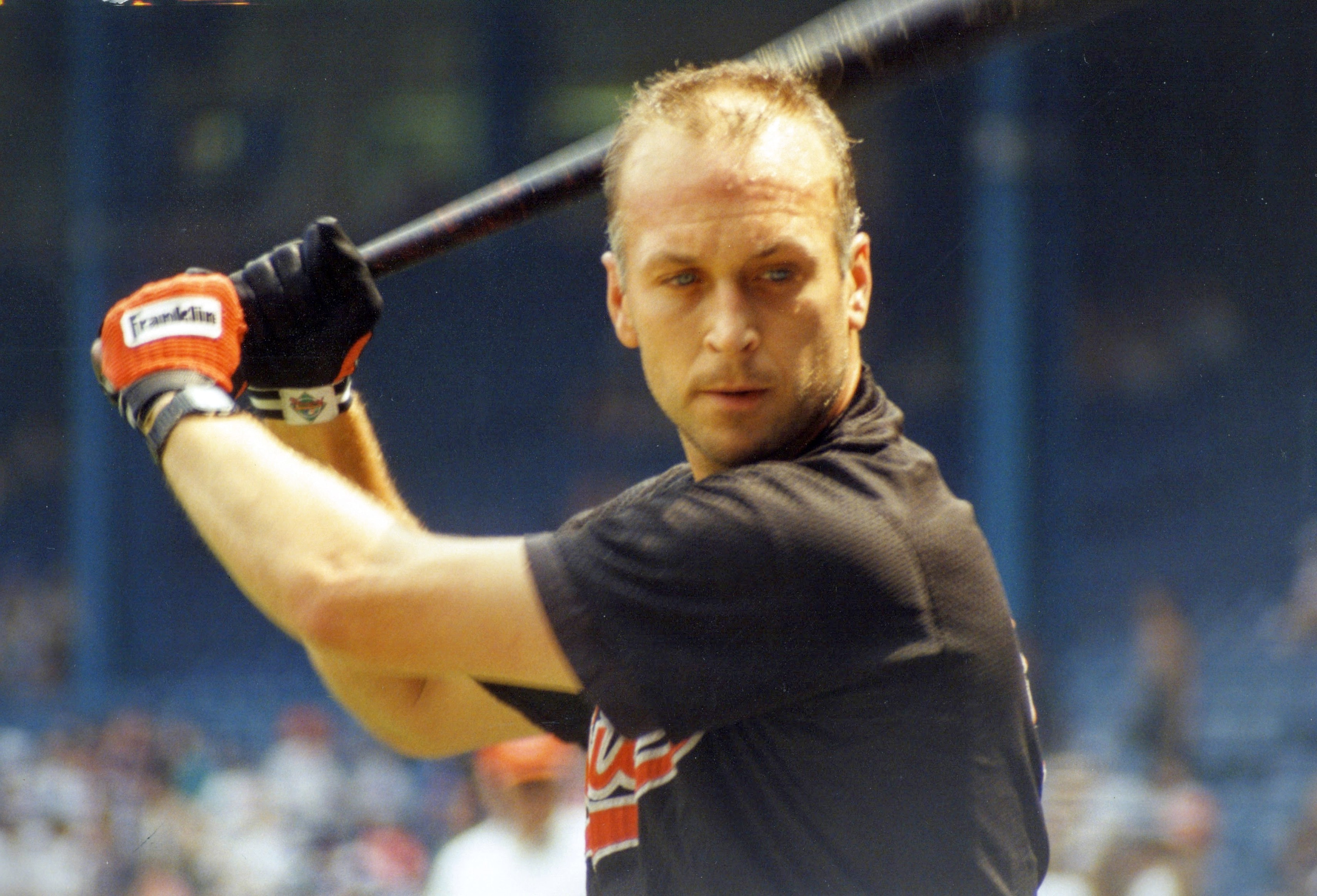
Ripken in 1993

For the first time in Ripken's career, he became the only Ripken in the Orioles' organization, as the Orioles ousted his father as coach and traded Billy to Texas. His slump continued at the start of the 1993 season, but Ripken managed to get out of it in May by adopting a taller batting stance. Because of his early-season struggles, some criticized him for playing every day. Bobby Bonds said of Ripken's playing every day, "That's idiotic. If I were his manager, he'd be out of there." Oriole coach Davey Lopes responded that only Ripken could tell whether or not he needed a day off.

On June 6, Ripken injured his knee during a brawl against the Seattle Mariners and was convinced for most of the next day that he would be unable to play. However, the knee felt better at gametime, enabling the streak to continue. Ripken achieved a personal milestone on July 10, when he collected his 2,000th career hit, during a game at Oriole Park at Camden Yards against Wilson Álvarez of the White Sox. Because of Ripken's struggles, most managers and some sportswriters felt he should be left out of the All-Star Game in Baltimore that year; however, the fans gave him more than two million votes to ensure his spot. Following the All-Star break, Ripken's hitting improved greatly, as he batted .300 with 14 home runs and 46 RBIs for the rest of the season. He finished the year batting .257 with 24 home runs and 90 RBIs.

Before the 1994 season, the Elias Sports Bureau informed the Orioles that Ripken had surpassed Ernie Banks for most career home runs as a shortstop with his 278th on July 15 against Scott Erickson. Banks met Ripken at a ceremony on February 9 and said, "I'm extremely happy that he broke this record because it give me a chance to come back and be remembered too." Ripken started the season strong, batting .340 with 19 RBIs through April. On May 24, Ripken had six RBIs, including his 300th home run against Teddy Higuera, as the Orioles rallied from a 5–0 deficit to defeat the Brewers 13–5. On August 1, he played in his 2,000th consecutive game, a 1–0 victory over the Twins at the Metrodome. Through 112 games, Ripken batted .315 with 13 home runs and 75 RBIs before the 1994–95 Major League Baseball strike canceled the rest of the season.

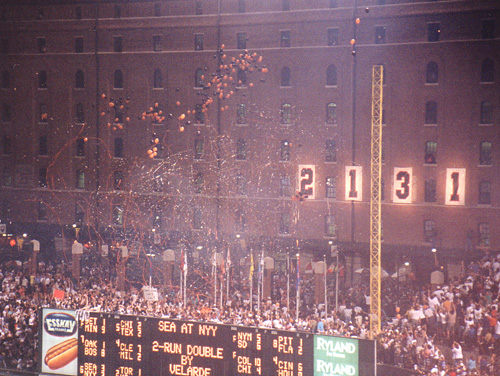
The numbers on the Orioles' warehouse changed from 2130 to 2131 on September 6, 1995, to celebrate Cal Ripken Jr. passing Lou Gehrig's consecutive games played streak.

Many baseball fans within and outside of the United States tuned into ESPN to watch Ripken surpass Lou Gehrig's 56-year-old record for consecutive games played (2,130 games). The game, between the Orioles and the California Angels, still ranks as one of the network's most-watched baseball games (baseball's most-watched game was Game 7 of the 1986 World Series). Cal's children, Rachel and Ryan, threw out the ceremonial first balls. Both President Bill Clinton and Vice President Al Gore were at the game; Clinton was with the commentators on ESPN for the Orioles' half of the fourth inning.

The Orioles erected special box seats for the game to raise money for the Johns Hopkins University to study Lou Gehrig's disease. When the game became official after the bottom of the fifth inning, the numerical banners that displayed Ripken's streak on the wall of the Baltimore & Ohio Warehouse at Camden Yards outside the stadium's right-field wall changed from 2130 to 2131.

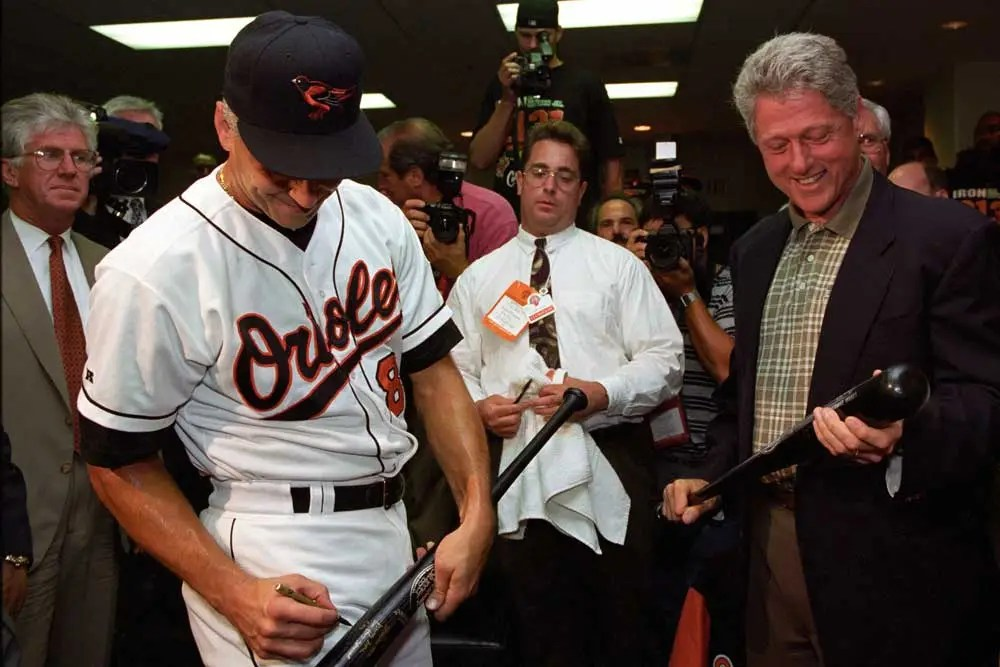
Ripken with President Bill Clinton after breaking Lou Gehrig's consecutive games played streak

Ripken received a standing ovation from the crowd, the opposing players, and the umpires that lasted more than 22 minutes, one of the longest standing ovations for any athlete; ESPN did not go to a commercial break during the entire ovation. During the ovation, Ripken did a lap around the entire Camden Yards warning track to shake hands and give high-fives to the fans.

After the game concluded, there was an elaborate ceremony which included a number of speeches from dignitaries including Joe DiMaggio, a teammate of Gehrig. During his speech, Ripken said, "Tonight I stand here, overwhelmed, as my name is linked with the great and courageous Lou Gehrig. I'm truly humbled to have our names spoken in the same breath. This year has been unbelievable. I've been cheered in ballparks all over the country. People not only showed me their kindness, but more importantly, they demonstrated their love of the game of baseball. I give my thanks to baseball fans everywhere. Tonight, I want to make sure you know how I feel. As I grew up here, I not only had dreams of being a big league ballplayer, but also of being a Baltimore Oriole. For all of your support over the years, I want to thank you, the fans of Baltimore, from the bottom of my heart. This is the greatest place to play."

Reflecting on that evening after his election to the Hall of Fame, Ripken said, "Bobby Bonilla and Rafael Palmeiro pushed me out of the dugout and said, 'Hey, if you don't do a lap around this thing, we'll never get the game started.' I thought it was a ridiculous sort of thing ... but as I started to do it, the celebration of 50,000 started to be very one-on-one and very personal. I started seeing people I knew ... Those were the people that had been around the ballpark all those years, and it was really a wonderful human experience."

Ripken hit .262 in 1995 with 17 home runs and had 88 RBIs.

==== 1996–2001 ====
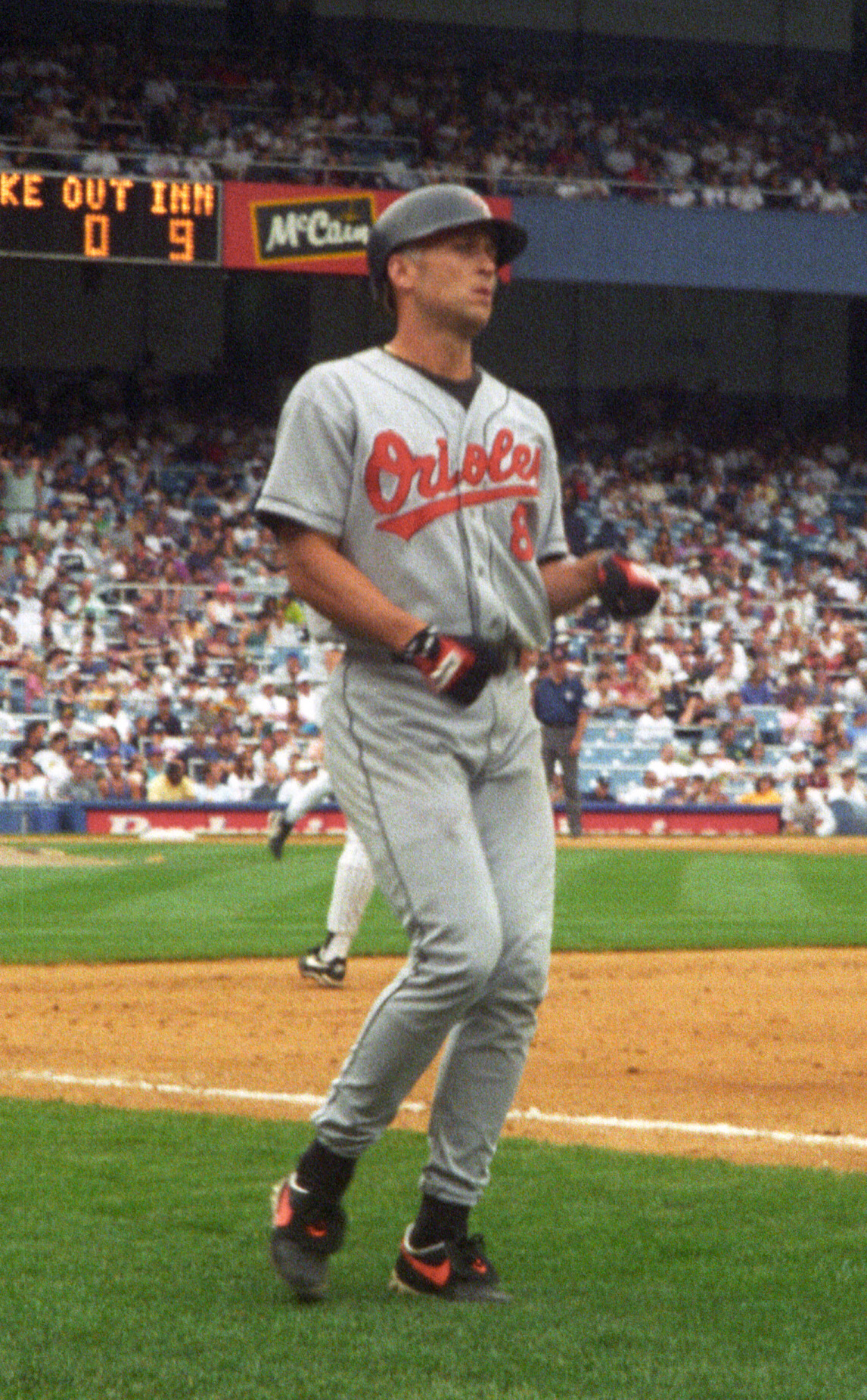
Ripken in 1996 at Yankee Stadium

Ripken began the 1996 season slowly, but his playing improved as the season went on. On June 14 at Kauffman Stadium in Kansas City against the Royals, Ripken broke the world record of consecutive games played by playing in his 2,216th. The record had been held by Sachio Kinugasa of Japan. Kinugasa was at the game to watch Ripken break his record. On July 15, Ripken was moved to third base as an experiment, with Manny Alexander taking the shortstop position. He was told the change would be permanent but was moved back to shortstop after Alexander had one hit in his six games at shortstop.

Ripken appeared in 163 games during the regular season in 1996, batting .278 with 26 home runs, 102 RBIs, and a .980 fielding percentage at shortstop. He returned to the playoffs for the first time in 13 years as the Orioles won the AL Wild Card. In the AL Division Series, Baltimore defeated Cleveland in four games, with Ripken batting .444 in the series. His average fell to .250 in the ALCS as the Orioles were defeated in five games by the Yankees.

In 1997, the Orioles signed free-agent shortstop Mike Bordick from the Oakland Athletics and moved Ripken back to third base permanently. General manager Pat Gillick said that the move was made not because of problems by Ripken but because more defensive options were available at shortstop than at third base. Had Ripken not wanted to move back to third base, the Orioles likely would have signed Tim Naehring instead.

Ripken was scheduled to become a free agent following the 1997 season, but at the start of the year he agreed to a two-year extension with the Orioles. During the season, he suffered from nerve damage that at times kept him from being able to sit on the bench. However, he did not miss a game and batted .270 with 17 home runs and 84 RBIs as the Orioles again made the playoffs—this time by winning the AL East. Ripken batted .438 as the Orioles defeated the Mariners in four games in the ALDS. He batted .348 and hit a home run in the ALCS, but the Orioles fell to Cleveland in six games.

Ripken batted .271 with 14 home runs and 61 RBIs in 1998. On September 20, before the final home game of the season against the Yankees, Ripken decided to end his streak at 2,632 games, having surpassed Gehrig's previous record by 502 games. Rookie third baseman Ryan Minor started in his place, at first thinking it was a rookie prank. Realizing that the streak was coming to an end, the fans, his teammates, and the visiting Yankees (with David Wells being the first to notice that Ripken was not playing during batting practice) gave Ripken an ovation after the game's first out was recorded. Ripken later stated that he decided to end the streak at the end of the season to avoid any offseason controversy about his playing status and to end the streak entirely on his own terms while he still could. Ripken returned to the lineup for the final seven games of the season, on the road against the Toronto Blue Jays and Boston Red Sox.

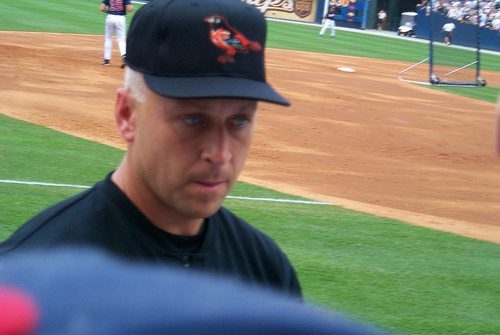
Ripken in the later part of his career

In 1999, Ripken had the highest batting average of his career, at .340. Although he was injured at both the beginning and the end of the 1999 season and also mourned the loss of his father and former coach Cal Ripken Sr. only a few days before 1999's opening game, he hit 18 homers in 332 at-bats (one HR every 18.4 AB's). He had the best individual game of his career, going 6-for-6 with two home runs off John Smoltz and tying a club record with 13 total bases against the Atlanta Braves on June 13. On September 2, he hit the 400th home run of his career against Rolando Arrojo of the Tampa Bay Devil Rays.

Ripken's 1999 season ended early due to injury when he was only nine hits away from joining the 3,000 hit club. He achieved the milestone early in the 2000 season in the April 15 game against the Twins at the Metrodome when he singled off reliever Héctor Carrasco; Eddie Murray, another member of the club and the Orioles' first-base coach, was the first to congratulate him. Ripken had a good night at the plate, recording three hits, the third of which was the milestone. Ripken missed all of July and August with a back injury. He was selected to the All-Star Game but sat out because of the injury, marking the first All-Star Game that he missed since his rookie season. In 83 games, Ripken batted .256 (his lowest total since 1992) with 15 home runs and 56 RBIs.

In June 2001, Ripken announced he would retire at the end of the season. He was voted the starting third baseman in the All-Star Game at Seattle's Safeco Field on July 10, 2001. In a tribute to Ripken's achievements and stature in the game, shortstop Alex Rodriguez (unknowingly foreshadowing his own future) insisted on exchanging positions with third baseman Ripken for the first inning, so that Ripken could play shortstop as he had for most of his career. That move allowed Ripken to claim the record of most MLB All-Star Game appearances at shortstop. In the third inning, Ripken made his first plate appearance and was greeted with a standing ovation. Ripken then homered off the first pitch from Chan Ho Park. Ripken ended up with All-Star MVP honors, becoming one of four players in MLB history with multiple All-Star Game MVP Awards (1991 and 2001) and the only player to be named All-Star Game MVP in two different decades.

The Orioles planned to retire Ripken's #8 in a ceremony before the final home game of the 2001 season, in late September. Ripken's final game was originally set to be played at Yankee Stadium; however, the September 11, 2001, attacks led to the postponement of a week's worth of games. The games missed were added onto the end of the season's schedule. Because all the games the Orioles missed were at home, this changed the location of Ripken's final game to Oriole Park, much to the delight of Orioles fans. On October 6, Ripken ended his career in the on-deck circle in the bottom of the ninth inning, with 48,807 fans in attendance. Longtime teammate Brady Anderson, also playing in his last game for the Orioles, swung and missed on a fastball high and tight on a 3–2 count to end the game. After the game, Ripken gave a speech thanking the fans for their support over 20 seasons. Ripken was healthier in his final season than he had been over his last two, as he appeared in 128 games. He batted a career-low .239 with 14 home runs and 68 RBIs.

== Charity ==
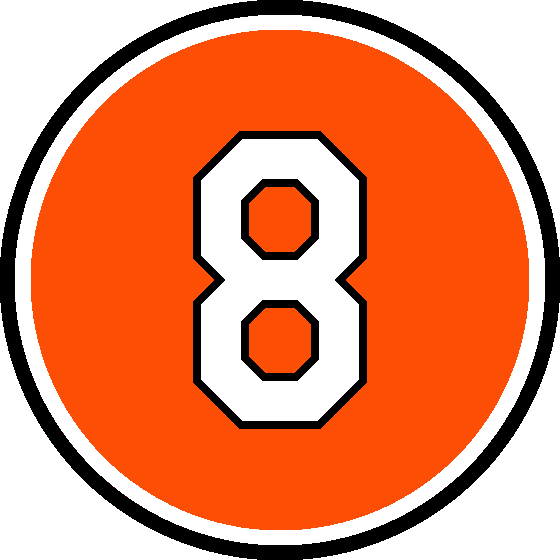
Cal Ripken Jr.'s number 8 was retired by the Baltimore Orioles in 2001.

Throughout his career, Ripken has contributed his time and money to numerous charitable organizations. Following the signing of his new contract in 1984, Ripken announced he would distribute 1984 Orioles tickets to underprivileged children in Harford County, donate to the Harford Center, and donate to the Baltimore School for the Performing Arts. In 1988, he and wife Kelly founded the Cal Ripken Jr., Lifelong Learning Center, which is dedicated to teaching adults to read. In 1992, MLB recognized him with the Roberto Clemente Award. In 1997, Ripken received the Golden Plate Award of the American Academy of Achievement presented by Awards Council members and Baltimore Orioles co-owners Peter Angelos and Tom Clancy.

Ripken has made donations to many various charitable causes, including donations supporting research on Lou Gehrig's disease. After he broke Gehrig's record, the Orioles, along with private donors, created the Cal Ripken/Lou Gehrig Fund for Neuromuscular Research at Johns Hopkins University. Along with his brother Billy, he formed the Cal Ripken Sr., Foundation in 2001 to give underprivileged children the opportunity to attend baseball camps around the country and learn the game. The Foundation is a branch of Ripken Baseball.

In addition to controlling these camps and Ripken's minor league teams, Ripken Baseball operates for-profit camps and designs ballfields for youth, college, and professional teams. He gives speeches about his time in baseball and some of the lessons he has learned. Between 2001 and 2004, inclusive, Ripken served as commissioner of the White House Tee Ball Initiative of President George W. Bush, in which capacity he worked to promote the value of teamwork amongst players and volunteership amongst the public and helped to teach tee ball fundamentals to teams of children at the White House.

In 2007, Ripken, along with Andre Agassi, Muhammad Ali, Lance Armstrong, Warrick Dunn, Mia Hamm, Jeff Gordon, Tony Hawk, Andrea Jaeger, Jackie Joyner-Kersee, Mario Lemieux, and Alonzo Mourning founded Athletes for Hope, a charitable organization, which helps professional athletes get involved in charitable causes and inspires millions of non-athletes to volunteer and support the community. Ripken also announced a partnership with Reviving Baseball in Inner Cities, with the donation of US$1 million in cash and equipment from the Cal Ripken Sr. Foundation.

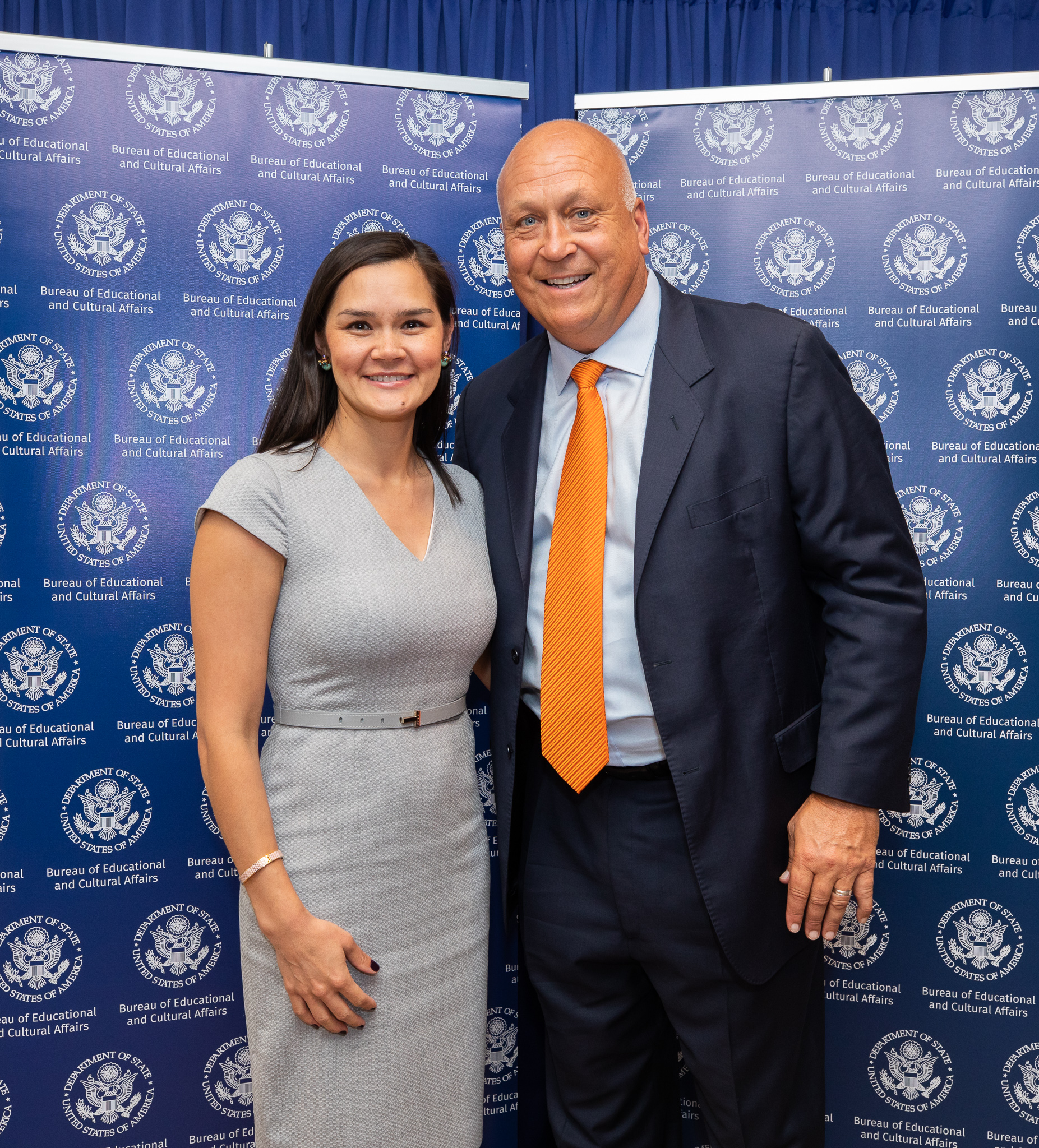
Ripken at a 2019 event discussing his experience as a Special Sports Envoy

On August 13, 2007, Secretary of State Condoleezza Rice announced that Ripken had been named Special Sports Envoy for the US State Department and that he would be going to China in October: "... we're just delighted that somebody of Cal Ripken's stature is going to be someone who will go out and represent America so well and represent what we consider to be American values, but universal values; that hard work and diligence and the willingness to really put it all on the line every day is something that kids need to learn", said Rice.

"A Shortstop in China" premiered on the Mid-Atlantic Sports Network on May 8, 2009, chronicling Ripken's trip to China to share the game of baseball with youth and coaches while nurturing American-Chinese diplomacy. The documentary included footage from the 11 clinics Cal and former Oriole B. J. Surhoff held from Beijing to Guangzhou. The documentary also showed Ripken accepting his appointment from Rice and featured a variety of interviews, from Ripken's wife Kelly to former Undersecretary of State for Public Diplomacy and Public Affairs, Karen Hughes.

On May 31, 2008, Ripken received an honorary Doctor of Humanities degree from the University of Delaware and served as the university's commencement speaker. On May 19, 2013, Ripken received an honorary Doctor of Public Service degree from the University of Maryland while serving as the university's general commencement speaker.

In an interview with Ray Robinson, Ripken said, "My personal philosophy is to get a feeling of fulfillment through my work. I have a desire to create something. I guess that's why I've long been fascinated by two books, The Fountainhead and Atlas Shrugged [both by Ayn Rand]. The leading figure in The Fountainhead, an architect named Howard Roark, is someone I've thought about a good deal."

== Legacy ==
At 6 ft 4 in (1.93 m), 225 lb (102 kg), Ripken was a departure from the prototypical shortstop of the time—small, fleet-of-foot players who played a defensively difficult position but often did not post the home run and batting average totals that an outfielder might. Power hitting shortstops such as Alex Rodriguez, Nomar Garciaparra and Miguel Tejada are often seen by fans to be part of Ripken's legacy.

Nonetheless, Ripken demonstrated the ability to play excellent defense at shortstop, and as a result remained a fixture there for well over a decade, leading the league in assists several times, winning the Gold Glove twice, and, in 1990, setting the MLB record for best fielding percentage in a season at his position. Though not a flashy fielder, Ripken displayed excellent fundamentals, and studied batters and even his own pitching staff so he could position himself to compensate for his lack of physical speed. Ripken's legacy as a fielder is reflected by his place near the top of almost every defensive statistical category—he holds at least one all-time record (for either season, career, or most seasons leading the league) in assists, putouts, fielding percentage, double plays, and fewest errors. Ripken's career range factor was 4.73 (and as high as 5.50 for a single season), a mark few shortstops have reached.

Ripken's power, which led to records such as most home runs by a shortstop and 13th place in career doubles, had consequences. His propensity to drive the ball often led to his grounders getting to fielders quickly for tailor-made double-play balls. In 1999, Ripken passed Hank Aaron as the player who had grounded into the most double plays in his career (a record that was again broken by Albert Pujols in 2017). Ripken is third on the fielding side for double plays by a shortstop (1565, behind Omar Vizquel's 1734 and Ozzie Smith's 1590).

Ripken was also notable for never settling on a signature batting stance during his long career. Sometimes referred to as "the man of 1,000 stances", Ripken would change his stance in response to a slump, or if his current choice "didn't feel good." When asked about his propensity for experimentation during an interview, Ripken responded that a batting stance "was only a starting point".

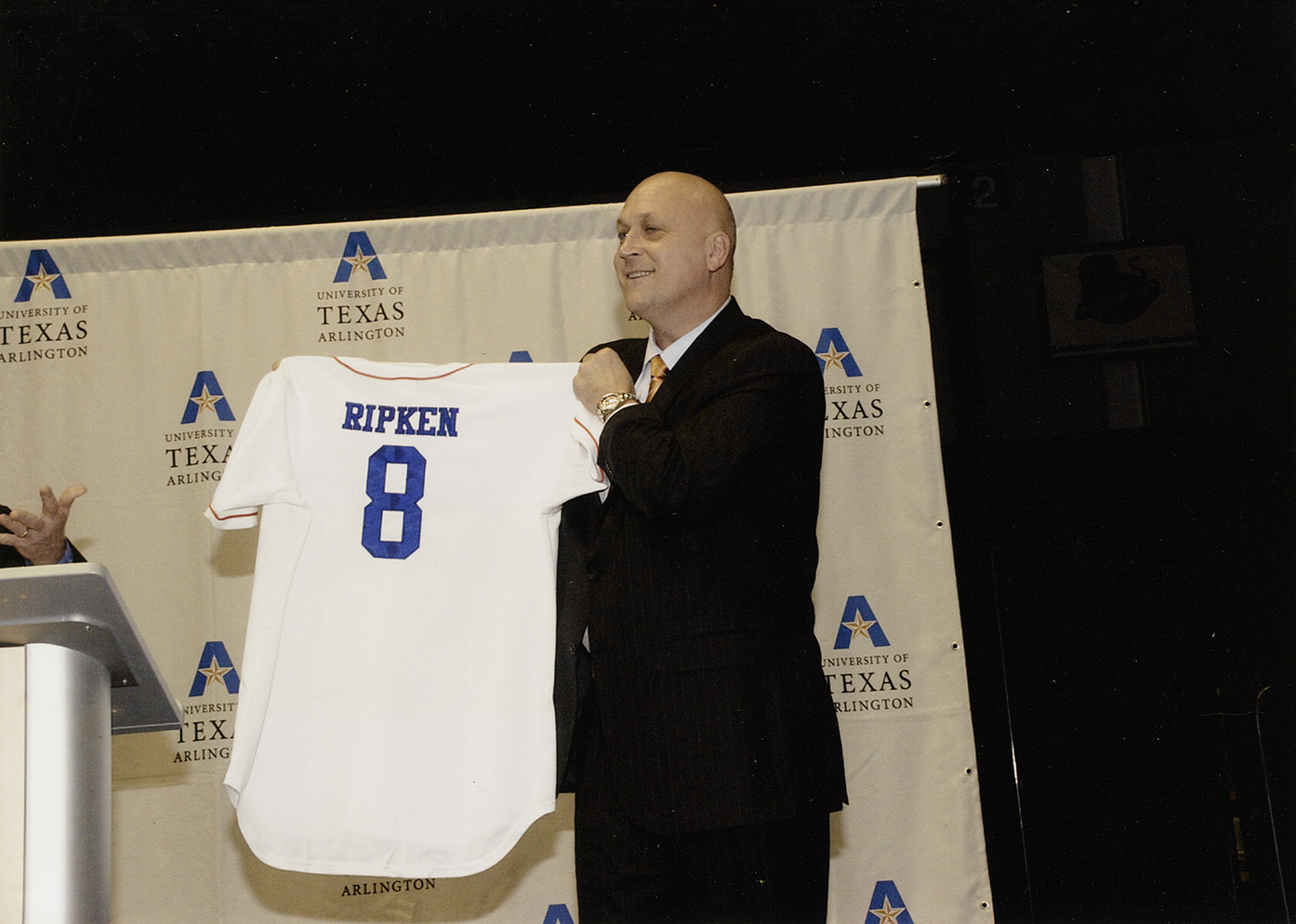
Ripken honored at the University of Texas at Arlington

A poll of fans by MLB.com ranked Ripken's 2,131st straight game the "Most Memorable Moment" in MLB history, leading such moments as Gehrig's farewell speech in 1939 and Jackie Robinson's breaking of the color barrier in 1947. 46,272 baseball fans attended this game and were able to witness this historical moment in person. The write-up in the 1996 Sporting News Baseball Guide, which was written shortly after Ripken set the record, called the streak "what almost everyone considered the high point of the major league season." In 2005, the Orioles honored Ripken on the 10th anniversary of his 2,131st consecutive game. After the top of the fifth inning, the numbers 2130 on the warehouse behind the stadium changed to 2131, just as they did on September 6, 1995.

Ripken has stated that he never felt comfortable being compared to Gehrig.

Lou has monstrous numbers and was like Babe Ruth. How was it possible to compare him to me? But I realized what we did share is playing in consecutive games. It was still uncomfortable for me. When you're mentioned with him, I'm not sure you fully understand what it means.

Billy and Cal Ripken are one of only four two-brother combinations in major league history to play second base/shortstop on the same club. The others are Garvin and Granny Hamner for the Philadelphia Phillies in 1945; the twins Eddie and Johnny O'Brien with the Pittsburgh Pirates in the mid-1950s, and Frank and Milt Bolling for the Detroit Tigers in 1958.

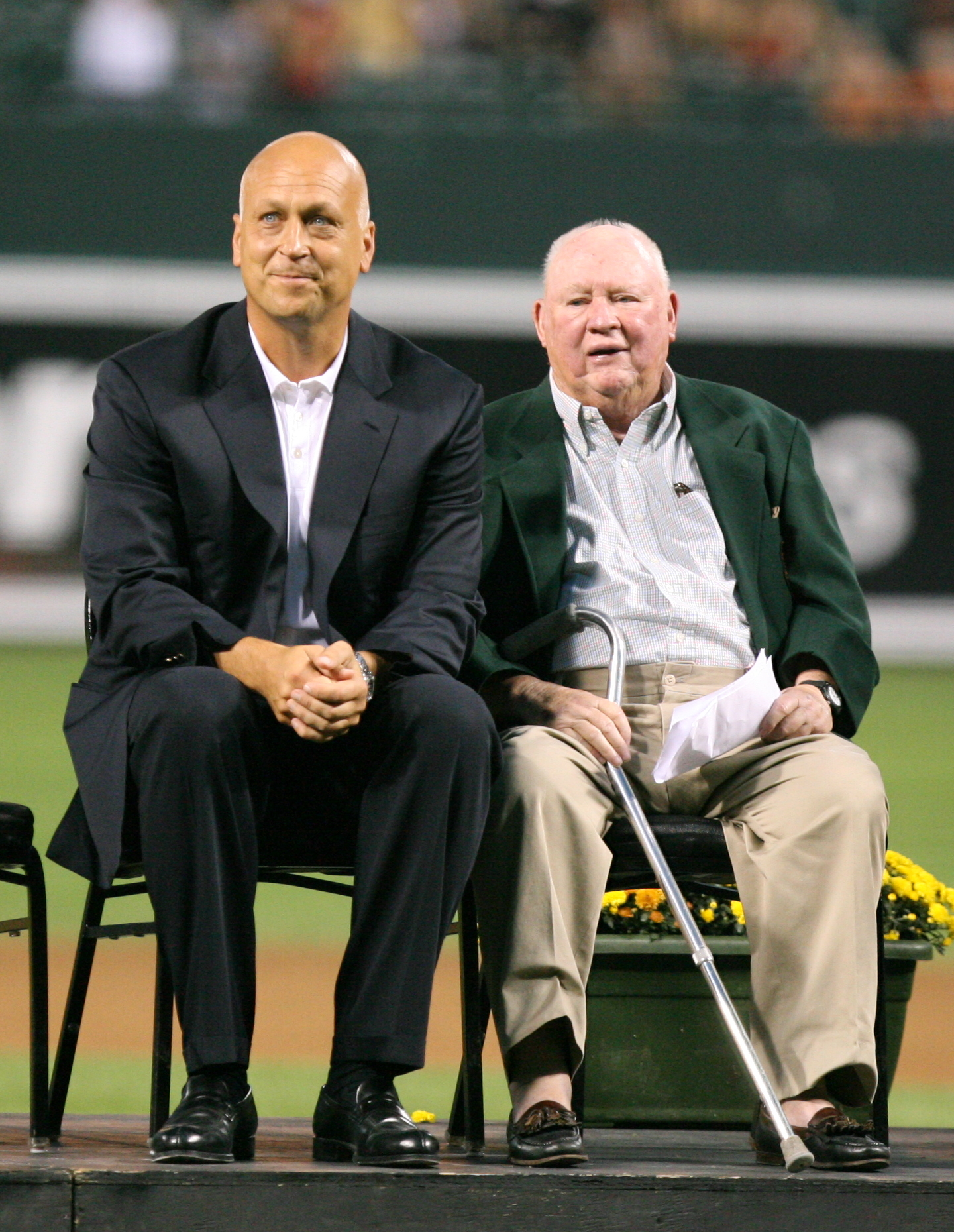
Ripken (left) is honored by the Orioles in 2007

On January 9, 2007, Ripken was elected to the Hall of Fame, appearing on 537 out of 545 of the ballots cast (98.53%), eight votes short of a unanimous selection. His percentage is the sixth-highest in history, behind Mariano Rivera (100%), Derek Jeter and Ichiro Suzuki (99.75%), Ken Griffey Jr. (99.32%), Tom Seaver (98.84%), and Nolan Ryan (98.79%). Tony Gwynn, who was appearing on his first ballot as well, was chosen alongside Ripken. Both Hall of Fame-Elects were formally inducted on July 29, 2007. The induction ceremony was attended by a record 75,000 people including special guests of Ripken: John Travolta, Kelly Preston, Steve Geppi, and Ron Shapiro (Ripken's agent during his career).

Ripken has received several tributes outside of baseball. On September 23, 2001, the NASCAR Winston Cup series and MBNA renamed the fall race at Dover International Speedway in Dover, Delaware, naming the race the MBNA Cal Ripken Jr. 400. The race paid tribute to the legacy of Ripken, who was in attendance greeting the competing drivers as they crossed the stage during driver introductions. Driver Bobby Labonte had a special paint scheme on his #18 Interstate Batteries car featuring Baltimore Orioles colors along with Ripken's retirement seal. The race was won by Dale Earnhardt Jr., who was then driving the #8 car. The race was also the first race held after the September 11, 2001, attacks as the race scheduled for Loudon a week earlier had been postponed in the wake of the attacks. On March 30, 2008, I-395's eastern branch in Baltimore, from I-95 to Conway Street, was named Cal Ripken Way.

Because of Ripken's success during his career, he became a prominent advertising figure, appearing in advertisements for brands such as Nike, Chevrolet, True Value Hardware, Wheaties, PowerAde, and other companies, some of which were small, Maryland businesses. These advertisements would often stress Ripken's "dependability, durability, and wholesomeness", linking that to their product. Ripken became an emblem to Americans through his hard work, loyalty to the Orioles, and his charity off the field.

Ripken was humble about his success, once saying,

I have talent, no doubt. My advantage is that I know the game well. The reason is that I grew up in it and had a good teacher in my father. I'm sure that whatever I am as a man and a ballplayer comes from the way I was raised. But am I a superstar? Oh, no. I don't think I stack up with the great players in the league.

— Cal Ripken Jr., Macnow, p. 60

Author Glen Macnow responded to Ripken's comments by writing, "Anyone who has seen Cal Ripken Jr. play knows differently."

== Personal life ==
Ripken was married to Kelly Geer. They have a daughter, Rachel, and a son, Ryan. On April 28, 2016, Ripken and Geer finalized their divorce after a one-year separation.

In 2018 Ripken married Laura Kiessling, who is a judge in the Appellate Court of Maryland. They have four children between them and reside in Annapolis, Maryland.

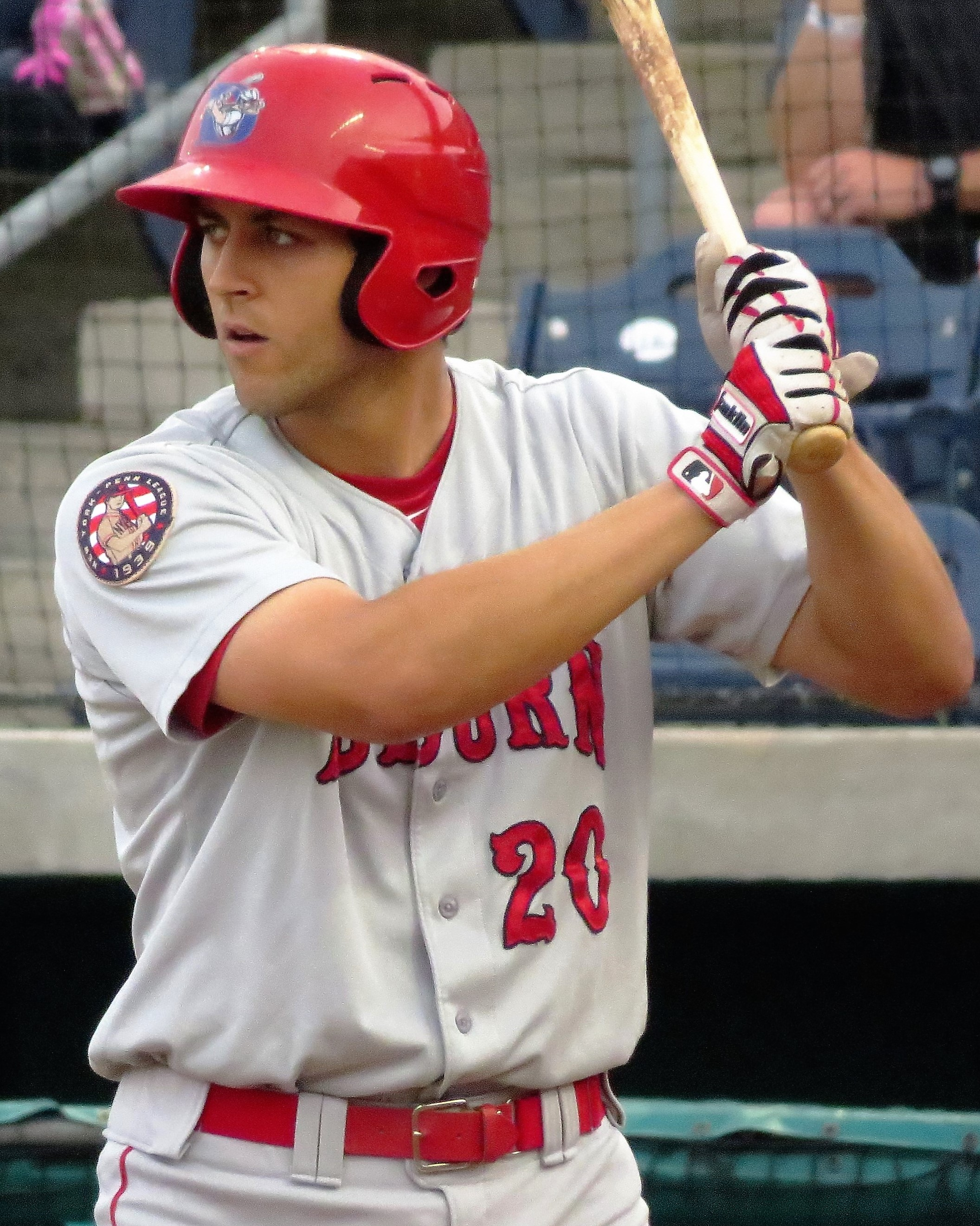
Ryan Ripken batting for the Auburn Doubledays in 2016

His son Ryan was also a baseball player, and was drafted by the Orioles in the 20th round of Major League Baseball's 2012 amateur draft. He chose to attend college instead, beginning his first year at the University of South Carolina in 2012. He transferred to Indian River Community College and was drafted in the 15th round of the Major League Baseball's 2014 amateur draft by the Washington Nationals. After being released by the Nationals in March 2017, he signed with the Orioles and was assigned to the Aberdeen Ironbirds, which were owned by his father, and played at a stadium that carries the family name. Ryan advanced as high as the AAA Norfolk Tides in 2021, but after going unsigned through the following offseason, he announced his retirement from professional baseball. In 2026, Ryan became a sports broadcaster with MASN Sports.

Ripken's mother, Violet Ripken, was kidnapped at gunpoint and safely returned on July 24, 2012. She was gone for 12 hours before her disappearance was reported to authorities. On October 15, 2013, she was approached by a man with a handgun in a parking lot at the NBRS Bank in Aberdeen, Maryland. The man demanded her car, but he fled after she activated a key alarm. She was unharmed. A spokesman for the Aberdeen Police said the two incidents appeared unrelated.

In 2020, Ripken announced that he had undergone successful treatment for prostate cancer.

Ripken has written or cowritten 17 books, and contributed forewords to numerous others. After the 1996 season, he released an autobiography titled The Only Way I Know, co-written with Mike Bryan, which was a New York Times Best Seller. Following his retirement, he wrote several more, including Play Baseball the Ripken Way: The Complete Illustrated Guide to the Fundamentals, also written by his brother Billy and co-authored by Larry Burke, in 2005. He released the book Parenting Young Athletes the Ripken Way, co-written with Rick Wolff, in 2006 after seeing too many young athletes who he felt were being pressured unnecessarily by their parents. He said, "I was thinking, 'This just creates too much pressure on kids.' They need to find an environment in which they can explore their game ... without all these kinds of pressures being brought to bear. Once I started thinking about it, I saw we had more than enough to fill a book." Then in 2007, he released three books, starting with Coaching Youth Baseball the Ripken Way, also written by his brother Billy and co-authored by Scott Lowe, which highlights 50 practice drills, topics include coaching responsibly, goal setting for youth, and effective practice planning. Later, in April of that year, he released two more books: Get in the Game: 8 Elements of Perseverance That Make the Difference, co-written with Donald T. Phillips, described as a motivational guide to success; and The Longest Season, co-written with Ron Mazellan, a children's book about the Orioles' 1988 season. In 2011, he released Hothead, a children's fiction book co-written with Kevin Cowherd which was also a New York Times bestseller. In addition, he has been writing a weekly youth sports advice newspaper column in the Baltimore Sun since 2005.

In addition to his writing, Ripken has been the subject of several books. In 1995, Harvey Rosenfeld released a biography on him entitled Iron Man: The Cal Ripken Jr., Story. Later, in 2007, Jeff Seidel released a biography on him entitled, Iron Man: Cal Ripken Jr., a Tribute. A children's biography of Ripken, Cal Ripken Jr., Quiet Hero was published in 1993 by Lois Nicholson. In addition, Ripken has been the subject of scholarly publications analyzing the impact of his career.

=== Business ventures ===
Ripken owns several minor league baseball teams. In 2002, he purchased the Utica Blue Sox of the New York–Penn League and moved them to his hometown of Aberdeen, renaming them the Aberdeen IronBirds. The team is the High-A affiliate team in the Orioles' system and plays at Ripken Stadium. On June 28, 2005, he announced that he was purchasing the Augusta GreenJackets of the South Atlantic League, a Single-A affiliate of the San Francisco Giants. At the end of the 2008 season, Ripken purchased the Vero Beach Devil Rays of the Single-A advanced Florida State League and moved them to Port Charlotte, Florida, where they were renamed the Charlotte Stone Crabs.

On January 10, 2007, Ripken expressed interest in purchasing the Baltimore Orioles if current owner Peter Angelos were to sell the team. He had yet to be approached as of 2013 about the potential purchase of the team. Though he had not purchased them, Ripken was quoted in a July 17, 2010, Associated Press article as saying he would consider rejoining the Orioles part-time as an advisor and full-time after his son graduated from high school in 2012.

In October 2007, Ripken began working as a studio analyst for TBS Sports during the 2007 Major League Baseball playoffs. He continued to serve in the role as of 2013.

Ripken was on the board of directors of ZeniMax Media until 2021. On February 28, 2008, Ripken announced his venture into the massively multiplayer online sports game market with Cal Ripken's Real Baseball.

In 2013, Ripken sold the Augusta GreenJackets to Agon Sports & Entertainment. In 2016, Ripken sold the Charlotte Stone Crabs to Caribbean Baseball Initiative headed by Lou Schwechheimer.

The Ripken Experience is a group of sports complexes. The first opened in Aberdeen, Maryland. A second location with nine baseball fields is located in Myrtle Beach, South Carolina. Opened in 2006, it cost $26 million with $7 million more spent since then. A third location was set to open in summer 2016 in Pigeon Forge, Tennessee.

In January 2024, John P. Angelos reached a $1.725 billion deal to sell the Baltimore Orioles to a group led by David Rubenstein. The group included Ripken, Michael Bloomberg, former Baltimore Mayor Kurt Schmoke, New York investment manager Michael Arougheti and NBA legend Grant Hill. It was not immediately clear how large Ripken's stake will be or what sort of role he will have. By March 2024, Ripken agreed to serve as an advisor with the team. In June 2026, The New York Times reported that Ripken had taken an active role in player development within the Orioles organization.

== Awards and records ==
=== Awards ===
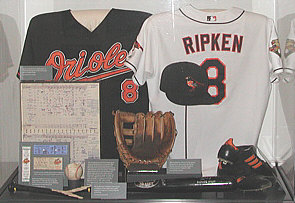
Cal Ripken Jr. exhibit at the Baseball Hall of Fame and Museum

Award / Honor	Time(s)	Date(s)
American League All-Star	19	1983–2001
American League Silver Slugger Award (SS)	8	1983–86, 1989, 1991, 1993, 1994
American League Most Valuable Player	2	1983, 1991
MLB All-Star Game Most Valuable Player	2	1991, 2001
American League Gold Glove Award (SS)	2	1991, 1992
The Sporting News' MLB Player of the Year	2	1983, 1991
American League Rookie of the Year	1	1982
Roberto Clemente Award	1	1992
Lou Gehrig Memorial Award	1	1992
Sports Illustrated magazine's "Sportsman of the Year"	1	1995
Associated Press "Athlete of the Year"	1	1995
The Sporting News' "Sportsman of the Year"	1	1995
Commissioner's Historic Achievement Award	1	2001
Stan Musial Lifetime Achievement Award For Sportsmanship	1	2016

=== Records and honors ===
- 1995: Broke Lou Gehrig's consecutive games streak
- 1999: Ranked #78 on The Sporting News' list of the "100 Greatest Baseball Players"
- 1999: Elected to the Major League Baseball All-Century Team.
- 2001: Uniform #8 retired by the Baltimore Orioles
- 2007: Elected to the Baseball Hall of Fame by 98.53% of voters, the highest percentage of votes ever for a position player, as well as third-highest overall.
- 2007: Inducted to the Baseball Hall of Fame on July 29 with the San Diego Padres' great Tony Gwynn in front of a record crowd of 75,000 people
- Most consecutive games played with 2,632
- Most consecutive innings played with 8,243
- Most home runs by a shortstop with 353
- Most double plays by a shortstop in the American League, with 1,682
- All-time leader in MLB All-Star fan balloting (36,123,483)
- Most American League MLB All-Star team selections with 19 – 1983–2001
- Most MLB All-Star Game appearances at shortstop with 15 – 1983–1996, 2001
- Most consecutive AL All-Star Game starts with 17
- Most plate appearances by one player in one game with 15 (Triple-A game tied with Tom Eaton and Dallas Williams).

=== Baltimore Oriole records ===
- Games played: 3,001
- Consecutive games: 2,632
- At bats: 11,551
- Hits: 3,184
- Runs: 1,647
- RBIs: 1,695
- Extra base hits: 1,078
- Doubles: 603
- Home runs: 431 (Baltimore has had six members of the 500 home run club on its roster, but none have hit more with the Orioles than Ripken)
- Total bases: 5,168
- Walks: 1,129
- Assists: 8,212
- Double plays: 1,682

== See also ==
- Cal Ripken Jr. Baseball, a 1992 video game
- Cal Ripken's Real Baseball, a 2003 video game
- DHL Hometown Heroes
- List of Major League Baseball annual doubles leaders
- List of Major League Baseball annual runs scored leaders
- List of Major League Baseball career doubles leaders
- List of Major League Baseball consecutive games played leaders
- List of Major League Baseball career games played as a shortstop leaders
- List of Major League Baseball career hits leaders
- List of Major League Baseball career home run leaders
- List of Major League Baseball career runs batted in leaders
- List of Major League Baseball career runs scored leaders
- List of Major League Baseball doubles records
- List of Major League Baseball individual streaks
- List of Major League Baseball players to hit for the cycle
- List of Major League Baseball players who spent their entire career with one franchise
- List of Major League Baseball single-game hits leaders
- List of second-generation Major League Baseball players
- Season Ticket: A Baseball Companion

Records
Preceded by Lou Gehrig	Most consecutive Major League Baseball starts 1982–1998	Succeeded by Incumbent
Achievements
Preceded by Frank White	Hitting for the cycle May 6, 1984	Succeeded by Carlton Fisk
