= Pere Ubu (disambiguation) =

Pere Ubu is an experimental rock music group from Cleveland, Ohio.

Père Ubu (or father Ubu) may also refer to:

- Ubu, the enigmatic central figure of a series of French plays by Alfred Jarry, including Ubu Roi, and subsequent plays Ubu Cocu (Ubu Cuckolded) and Ubu Enchaîné (Ubu Enchained)

== See also ==
- Ubu (disambiguation)
