= Ubo =

Ubo may refer to:

- Ubo, the element symbol for unbioctium
- Ubo, a barangay in Balud, Masbate, Philippines
- Ubo, a barangay in Daram, Samar, Philippines
- Ubo tribe, a tribe within the Lumad peoples of the Philippines

UBO may stand for:

- uBlock Origin, a content-filtering web browser extension
- Unincorporated business organization
- Université de Bretagne Occidentale, Brest, in the Academy of Rennes
- Universitetsbiblioteket i Oslo
- Cal Ripken's Real Baseball, also known as Ultimate Baseball Online
- Ultimate beneficial ownership, a term in domestic and international commercial law

== See also ==
- UBOS (disambiguation)
- Ubu (disambiguation)
