= U of B =

U of B may refer to:

- University of Bridgeport, Bridgeport, Connecticut
- University of Baltimore, Maryland
- University of Barcelona, Catalonia, Spain
- University of Belgrano, Buenos Aires, Argentina
- University of Botswana
- University at Buffalo, The State University of New York

== See also ==
- UB (disambiguation)
