= Nastro d'Argento =

Italian annual film awards

Nastro d'Argento (Silver Ribbon)
- Nastro d'Argento gold silhouette
- Awarded for: Categories
- Location: Taormina, Sicily, Italy
- Country: Italy
- Presented by: Italian National Syndicate of Film Journalists
- First award: 1946; 80 years ago
- Website: www.nastridargento.it

The Nastro d'Argento (plural: Nastri d'Argento; English: Silver Ribbon) is an Italian film award, held since 1946 by the Sindacato Nazionale Giornalisti Cinematografici Italiani (Italian National Union of Film Journalists). Awards are given annually in a wide range of categories, covering not only feature films but also short films (Corti d'argento) and television series (Nastri d'Argento Grandi Serie). The main awards are given at Taormina Film Fest, Sicily, while the short film awards ceremony is held in Naples.

== History ==
The Nastri d'Argento awards, which are also known by their name in English, Silver Ribbons, have been given each year since 1946 by the Italian National Syndicate of Film Journalists (Italian: Sindacato Nazionale Giornalisti Cinematografici Italiani).

From 1950, the main award was Best Director, with no award given for Best Film until sometime after 1991. This is because it was assumed that the best director made the best film. This was different from other countries, where best film was often associated with the producer; at the Nastri d'Argento, a separate category recognised the producer. However "Film of the Year" is now awarded.

For many of its early years, there was criticism that journalists carried too much weight in the voting process, and film critics too little, so that experimental and independent films were not properly considered for awards. In response to this, a breakaway group of press film critics formed the Sindacato Nazionale Critici Cinematografici Italiani (National Union of Film Critics) in May 1971.

The Silver Ribbons ceremony was at first held in February each year, giving awards for films released in the preceding calendar year. In 1971, the committee changed the schedule so that films made up until May each year would be eligible for the awards, which were then granted in June. This was because the David di Donatello awards (the "Davids", or "Dontatellos"), along with many other awards, were given at that time, and summer was considered generally the best months for awards ceremonies. In 1989, the date of the awards was changed back to February and the eligibility set back to the calendar year.

The Davids ceremony took place at the Teatro Antico (Ancient Theatre) until 1980. The Silver Ribbons continued there until 1989, and have continued there from 2000.

From 1992, a new award for short films was established, the Corti d'Argento ("Silver Shorts"), which from 2013 included a section for animated short films.

In 2020, a new set of awards was established, in collaboration with the Campania Region Film Commission in Naples, to honour great international television series (Grandi Serie Internazionali). The inaugural edition of the Nastri d'Argento Grandi Serie Internazionali was held in Naples in September 2021.

In 2023 the event was held on 1 July. The 2024 event will be held at MAXXI - National Museum of 21st Century Art on 27 June.

== Description ==
The Nastri d'Argento are a set of film awards given every year at an awards ceremony at the Teatro Antico in Taormina, Sicily, as part of the Taormina Film Fest, except for the Nastri d'Argento Grandi Serie, which are held in Naples.

== Awards ==
The awards are given in the following categories:

=== Feature films ===
- Best Film (Miglior film; since 2017)
- Best Director (Miglior regista, since 2017)
- Best Comedy (Migliore commedia; since 2009)
- Best New Director (Miglior regista esordiente; since 1974)
- Best Producer (Miglior produttore; since 1954)
- Best Original Story (Migliore soggetto)
- Best Screenplay (Migliore sceneggiatura; since 1948)
- Best Actor (Migliore attore protagonista)
- Best Actress (Migliore attrice protagonista)
- Best Supporting Actor (Migliore attore non protagonista)
- Best Supporting Actress (Migliore attrice non protagonista)
- Best Comedy Actor (Migliore attore di commedia; since 2018)
- Best Comedy Actress (Migliore attrice di commedia; since 2018)
- Best Cinematography (Migliore fotografia)
- Best Production Design (Migliore scenografia)
- Best Costume Design (Migliori costumi; since 1953)
- Best Score (Migliore colonna sonora; since 1947)
- Best Original Song (Migliore canzone originale; since 1999)
- Best Editing (Migliore montaggio; since 1990)
- Best Sound (Migliore sonoro in presa diretta; since 2002)
- Best Casting Director (Miglior casting director; since 2014)
- Best Documentary (Miglior documentario)
- Best Documentary on Cinema (Miglior documentario sul cinema)
- Best Dubbing (Miglior doppiaggio)

=== Television series ===
The Nastri d'Argento Grandi Serie (Internazionali) have been awarded for television series since 2021, in a ceremony held in Naples.

=== Corti d'Argento ===
The Corti d'argento is a section for short films, with Best Short Film (Miglior cortometraggio) and a separate award for animated short films.

=== Special awards ===
- Life Achievement Award (Nastro d'argento alla carriera)
- Special Award (Nastro d'argento speciale)

=== Defunct awards ===
- Director of Best Film (Regista del miglior film; 1946–2016)
- Director of Best Foreign Film (Regista del miglior film straniero; 1956–2006)
- Best European Film (Miglior film europeo; 2007–2012)
- Best Non-European Foreign Film (Miglior film extraeuropeo; 2007–2012)
- Best 3D Film (Miglior film in 3D; 2010)
- European Silver Ribbon Award (Nastro d'argento europeo; 1989–2020)

== Notable winners ==
=== 1980s ===
- 1981: Massimo Troisi
- 1987: Giuseppe Tornatore, with his debut feature Il camorrista, who went on to win it many times
- 1987: Roberto Benigni, as the protagonist of Down by Law

== See also ==
- Cinema of Italy
- Italian entertainment awards
- Nastri d'argento 2023
- Taormina Film Fest
