= David di Donatello =

Annual Italian film award ceremony

David di Donatello Awards
- Current: 71st David di Donatello
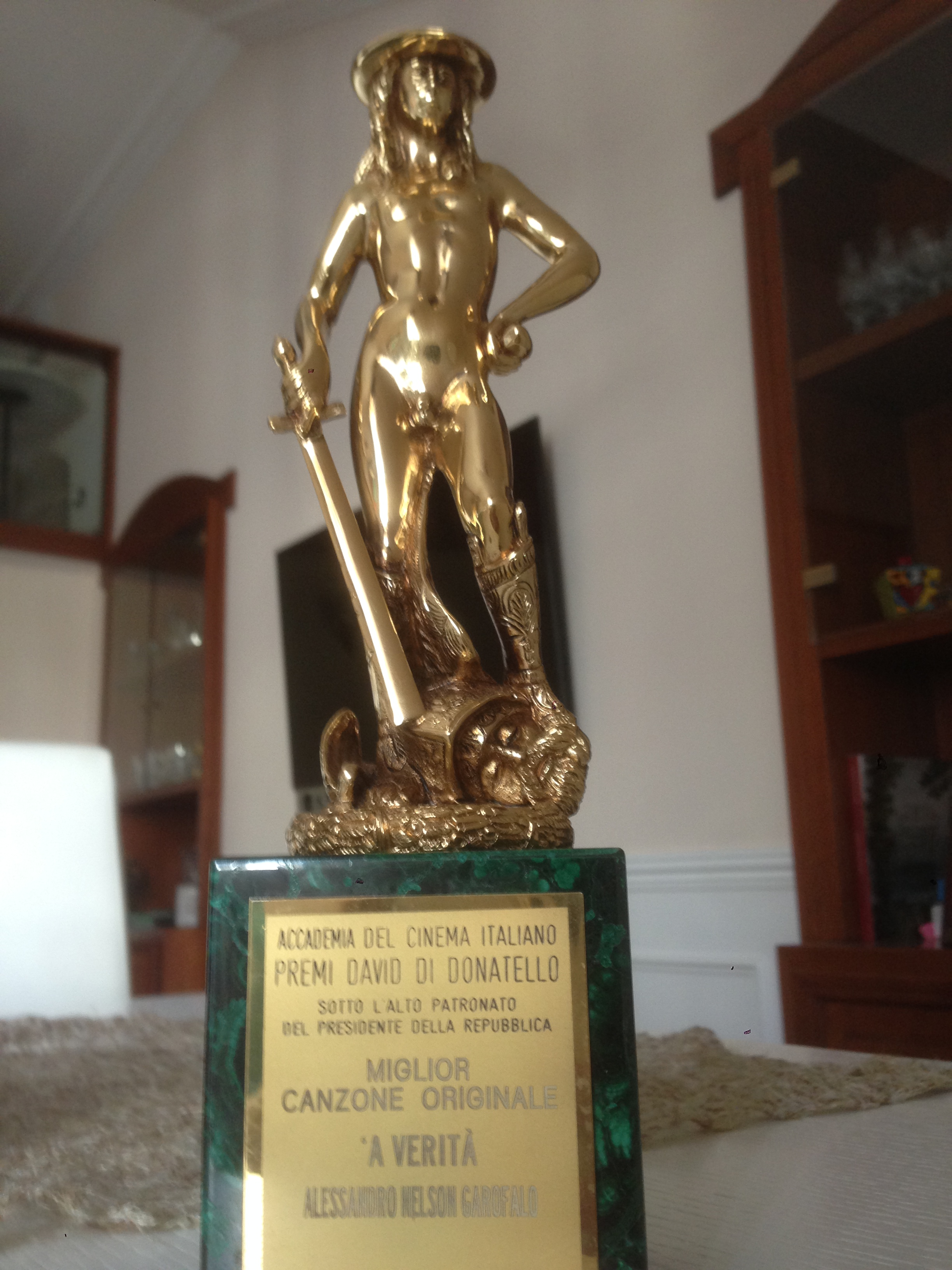
- A David di Donatello awarded in 2014
- Awarded for: The best of Italian and foreign motion picture productions
- Date: 1955; 71 years ago
- Country: Italy
- Presented by: Academy of Italian Cinema
- First award: 5 June 1956
- Website: www.daviddidonatello.it

The David di Donatello Awards, named after Donatello's David, a symbolic statue of the Italian Renaissance, are film awards given out each year by the Accademia del Cinema Italiano (the Academy of Italian Cinema). There are 26 award categories, as of 2023. The industry-voted awards are considered the Italian equivalent of the American Academy Awards.

== History ==
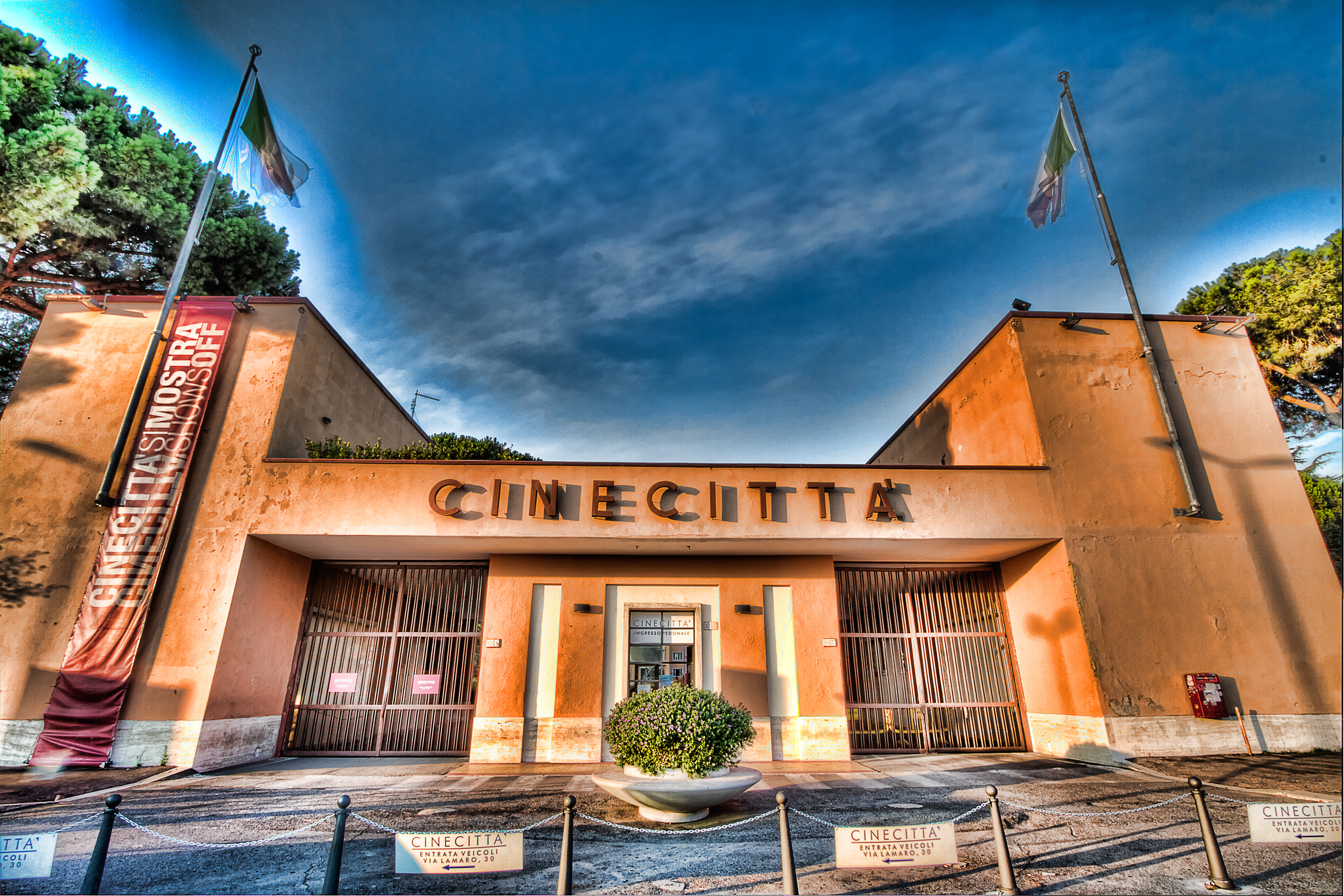
The Italian studio complex Cinecittà, where the David di Donatello award ceremony has been held several times.

The David di Donatello film awards were founded in 1955 by the founding president of AGIS (Italian General Association for Show Business), businessman Italo Gemini, in order to honour the best of each year's Italian and foreign films. It was first awarded in Rome on 5 July 1956.

The David di Donatello film awards follow the same criteria as the American Academy Awards.

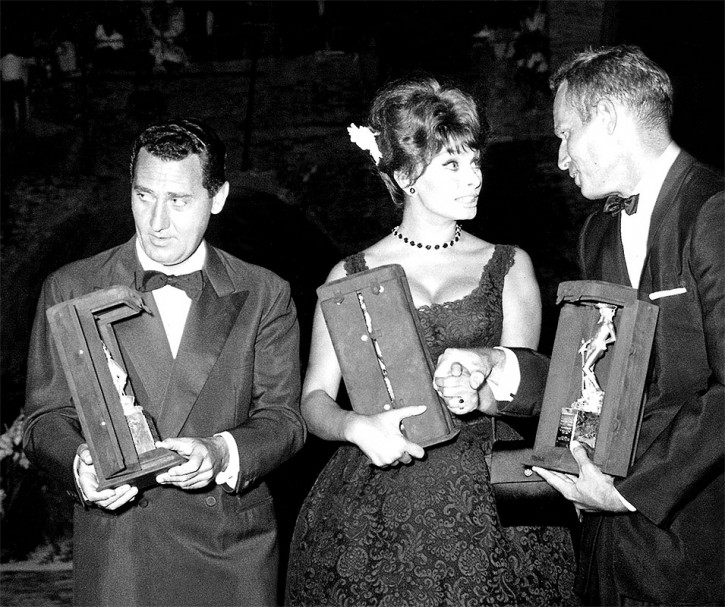
Sophia Loren, Alberto Sordi and Charlton Heston, David di Donatello 1961

Similar prizes had already existed in Italy for about a decade, such as the Nastro d'Argento, but these were voted on by film critics and journalists. The Donatellos are awarded by people within the film industry, including actors, producers, directors, screenwriters, and technicians.

After Rome, from 1957 to 1980, the ceremony was held at the Greek Theatre in Taormina during Taormina Film Fest, then twice in Florence, finally returning to Rome, always with the support of the President of the Italian Republic and now with the collaboration of the Rome City Council cultural policies department.

The founding organization, now called the Accademia del Cinema Italiano, works in concert with and thanks to the contribution of the Italian Ministry of Culture and Ministry of Tourism.

The prizes are awarded primarily to Italian films, with a category dedicated to foreign-language films.

== Presidents ==
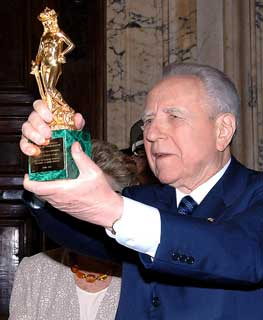
Italian President Ciampi shows the prize at the 2005 awards ceremony.

The following is a list of presidents of the Academy of Italian Cinema:

President	Start	End	Notes
Italo Gemini	1955	1970	
Eitel Monaco	1971	1977	
Paolo Grassi	1978	1980	
Gian Luigi Rondi	1981	2016†	President for life since 2009
Giuliano Montaldo	2016	2017	Interim
Piera Detassis	2018	2026	First woman to hold the office
Silvia Calandrelli	2026	current	

† Died in office.

== Trophy ==
The David di Donatello trophy is in the form of a gold David statuette, a replica of Donatello's famous sculpture, on a square malachite base with a gold plaque recording the award category, year, and winner.

The 1956 David by Bulgari, awarded to Gina Lollobrigida for Beautiful but Dangerous, was auctioned at Sotheby's in 2013.

== Award categories ==
- David di Donatello for Best Film
- David di Donatello for Best Director
- David di Donatello for Best Directorial Debut
- David di Donatello for Best Producer
- David di Donatello for Best Actress
- David di Donatello for Best Actor
- David di Donatello for Best Supporting Actress
- David di Donatello for Best Supporting Actor
- David di Donatello for Best Original Screenplay
- David di Donatello for Best Adapted Screenplay
- David di Donatello for Best Cinematography
- David di Donatello for Best Score
- David di Donatello for Best Original Song
- David di Donatello for Best Production Design
- David di Donatello for Best Costumes
- David di Donatello for Best Make-up
- David di Donatello for Best Hairstyling
- David di Donatello for Best Editing
- David di Donatello for Best Sound
- David di Donatello for Best Visual Effects
- David di Donatello for Best Documentary
- David di Donatello for Best Foreign Film
- David di Donatello for Best Short Film
- David Youth Award (formerly known as David School Award)
- David Special Award (also known as David Career Award during some years) – awarded irregularly
- David Viewers' Award (since 2019)
- David di Donatello for Best Casting (since 2025)

== Retired awards ==
- David di Donatello for Best Foreign Director (1966–1990)
- David di Donatello for Best Foreign Actor (1957–1996)
- David di Donatello for Best Foreign Actress (1957–1996)
- David di Donatello for Best New Actor (1982–1983)
- David di Donatello for Best New Actress (1982–1983)
- David di Donatello for Best European Film (2004–2018, merged into Best Foreign Film)
- David di Donatello for Best Screenplay (1975–2016, split into Best Original Screenplay and Best Adapted Screenplay)
- David di Donatello for Best Foreign Producer (1956–1990 except 1959, 1960, 1962, 1963, 1964, and from 1972 to 1980)
- David di Donatello for Best Foreign Screenplay (1979–1990)
- David di Donatello for Best Foreign Score (1979–1980)
- Golden plaque (1956–2001 except 1961, 1962, from 1975 to 1983, and from 1985 to 1989)
- European David (1973–1983)
- David Franco Cristaldi (1992 and 1993)
- David Luchino Visconti (1976–1995)
- David René Clair (1982–1987)
- Alitalia Award (1984–1991)
- Gold medal of the Municipality of Rome
- Gold medal of the Minister for Tourism and Entertainment

== Statistics ==
=== Multiple prize-winning actors ===
As of 2025, with seven awards each, Margherita Buy, Alberto Sordi, Vittorio Gassman, and Sophia Loren are the actors who have won the most Davids.

Women

Actor	Leading		Supporting		Total	
Actor	W	N	W	N	W	N
Margherita Buy	5	14	2	3	7	17
Alberto Sordi	7	8	0	0	7	8
Vittorio Gassman	7	7	0	0	7	7
Sophia Loren	7	7	0	0	7	7
Elio Germano	5	7	1	3	6	11
Giancarlo Giannini	4	7	1	3	5	10
Valeria Bruni Tedeschi	4	6	1	1	5	7
Marcello Mastroianni	5	6	0	0	5	6
Monica Vitti	5	6	0	0	5	6
Marina Confalone	1	1	4	5	5	6
Valerio Mastandrea	2	9	2	5	4	14
Toni Servillo	4	10	0	2	4	12
Mariangela Melato	4	5	0	0	4	5
Nino Manfredi	4	4	0	0	4	4

== See also ==
- Italian entertainment awards
- List of film awards
