= Kevin Cowherd =

American sportswriter

Kevin Cowherd is an American author, humorist and former award-winning sports and features columnist for The Baltimore Sun. He is the author, along with Hall of Famer Cal Ripken Jr., of The New York Times best-seller Hothead and five other baseball novels for young readers. Their latest book, The Closer, was published by Disney-Hyperion Books in March 2016.

== Biography ==
Cowherd's debut novel, "The Gym," was published in November 2023 by Apprentice House Press. A "darkly-funny" tale of Jack Doherty, a walking mid-life crisis who, overweight and lonely, newly-divorced after a spectacular act of infidelity on the part of his wife, joins a gym hoping for an existential do-over, if not washboard abs and bulging biceps.

Cowherd's latest work of non-fiction is When the Crowd Didn't Roar: How Baseball's Strangest Game Ever Gave a Broken City Hope. The story of the singular 2015 game between the Baltimore Orioles and Chicago White Sox, played against the backdrop of Baltimore's ruinous Freddie Gray riots and the only game in Major League Baseball history held in a locked stadium in front of zero fans, will be published by the University of Nebraska Press in April 2019.

Cowherd has also written five other books of non-fiction: including: U Must Be Cinderella: Inside College Basketball's Greatest Upset Ever and the Audacious School That Pulled It Off..; Way Down in the Hole: The Meteoric Rise, Tragic Fall and Ultimate Redemption of America's Top Cop; The Art of Crisis Leadership with co-author Rob Weinhold; The Opening Act: Comedy, Life and the Desperate Pursuit of Happiness, a memoir of Baltimore comedian Larry Noto; and a biography, Hale Storm: The Incredible Saga of Baltimore's Ed Hale, Including a Secret Life with the CIA.

Cowherd has also written for Men's Health, Parenting and Baseball Digest magazines and is the author of a collection of Baltimore Sun columns, Last Call at the 7-Eleven, published in 1995 by Bancroft Press.

Cowherd, then a Baltimore Sun sports columnist, was also given tongue-in-cheek credit for correctly "predicting" the Loma Prieta earthquake. On Tuesday October 17, 1989, the Loma Prieta earthquake occurred in the greater San Francisco Bay Area in California, interrupting preparations for Game 3 of the 1989 World Series between the Bay Area's two Major League Baseball teams, the Oakland Athletics and the San Francisco Giants. In the morning edition of The San Jose Mercury News that day, Cowherd's column had "predicted" the earthquake, as he wrote that "these are two teams are from California and God only knows if they'll even get all the games in. An earthquake could rip through the Bay Area before they sing the national anthem for Game 3," which was precisely when the quake occurred.
