= White House Tee Ball Initiative =

Presidential sports initiative

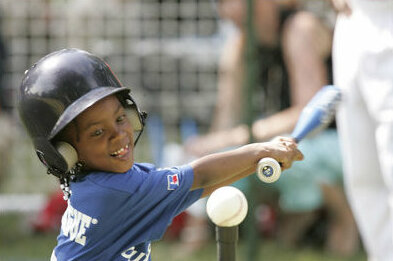
A batter swings at the ball Sunday, June 26, 2005, during "Tee Ball on the South Lawn.

White House Tee Ball Initiative refers to efforts by President George W. Bush to promote baseball and softball by allowing youth tee-ball events on the grounds of the White House in Washington, D.C. The event was first held in 2001.

In 2001, U.S. President Bush initiated what he described as the "White House Tee Ball Initiative". The purpose was to promote interest in childhood sports, including baseball and softball. According to the White House, the Tee Ball Initiative promoted "a spirit of teamwork and service for America's youth."

The plan was to invite teams from around the United States to play tee-ball at the White House. Teams were to be selected by the Little League Baseball Association.

== About tee-ball ==
Tee-ball is considered "the entry sport to baseball and softball for young players", as it generally requires less skill than baseball. Tee-ball associations allow children between the ages of four and eight to play in their leagues. It is estimated that 2.2 million children play tee-ball.

The principal difference between tee-ball and softball or baseball is that the child hits the ball off of a tee; the ball is not pitched. Thus, tee-ball allows a young child to learn the skills of batting, catching, running the bases, and throwing, while making it both easier to hit the ball and less likely for batters to be injured since they do not need to dodge wayward pitches.

The capitalized, spaced spelling "Tee Ball" is actually a registered trademark in the US of one particular, church-affiliated organization since the 1970s, though the game goes back to at least the 1950s in various parts of the United States.

== List of White House Tee Ball Commissioners ==
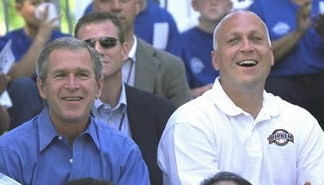
Cal Ripken, Junior, right, the Initiative's first commissioner, watches a game with President George W. Bush at the White House in June 2002.

- 2006 Commissioner Willie Mays July 30, 2006
- 2005 Commissioner Barry Larkin June 24, 2005
- 2004 Commissioner Nolan Ryan April 5, 2004
- 2001-04 Commissioner Cal Ripken Jr. June 20, 2003

== See also ==
- Barney (dog)
- Miss Beazley
