= Ubu =

Ubu or UBU may refer to:

== Arts and entertainment ==
- The title character of Ubu Roi (King Ubu), an 1896 French play by Alfred Jarry and subsequent plays
- Ubu Repertory Theater, New York City, dedicated to presenting French plays translated into English
- Ubu Awards for Italian theater – see Italian entertainment awards
- Ubu Films, a Sydney-based Australian underground filmmakers' cooperative that existed from 1965 to ca. 1972
- Ubu Productions, Inc., a production company founded by television producer Gary David Goldberg
- Ubu (album), the debut album by Illion, a.k.a. Radwimps vocalist Yojiro Noda
- Ubu (Dragon Ball), a character in Dragon Ball media
- Ubu (comics), a character from DC Comics
- "Ubu", a song by Blurt on their album Blurt in Berlin
- "Ubu", a song by Methyl Ethel on their album Everything Is Forgotten
- Ubu, a member of the League of Assassins and the trusted henchman of supervillain Ra's al Ghul in DC Comics

== UBU ==
- University of Bradford Union, a student union in the United Kingdom
- University of Bristol Union, a student union in the United Kingdom
- University of Burgos, a public university in the Spanish city of Burgos
- Ubu Productions (trademarked UBU), a U.S. television production company
- Burundi Workers' Party (Kirundi: Umugambwe wa'Bakozi Uburundi), a clandestine Marxist political party in Burundi
- FC UBU, a football club based in Ulaanbaatar, Mongolia

== Other uses ==
- Ubu, Nepal, a Village Development Committee
- Unbiunium, symbol Ubu for '121', a theoretical chemical element
- Ubu Roi, mascot of Ubu Productions
- ISO 639-3 code for the Trans–New Guinea language Umbu-Ungu

== See also ==
- Pere Ubu, an experimental rock band from Cleveland, Ohio
- UbuWeb, a public domain web-based educational resource for avant-garde material
- UB (disambiguation)
- Ubo (disambiguation)
