= USB (disambiguation) =

USB stands for Universal Serial Bus, a computer bus standard.

USB may also refer to:

== Science and technology ==
- Upper sideband, of an AM signal
- Unified S-band communication for the Apollo program
- Unseptbium, symbol Usb, a theorized chemical element

== Organisations ==
- Save Bessarabia Union (Uniunea Salvați Basarabia), Moldovan political party
- Save Bucharest Union (Uniunea Salvaţi Bucureștiul), Romanian political party
- Simón Bolívar University (Venezuela), (Universidad Simón Bolívar), Caracas, Venezuela
- Simón Bolívar University (Mexico), (Universidad Simón Bolívar), Mexico City
- Union Savings Bank, Connecticut, US
- University Hospital of Basel, (Universitätsspital Basel), Switzerland
- U.S. Bancorp, NYSE ticker symbol
- USB Corporation, life science products company
- Unione Sindacale di Base, trade union in Italy
- United Soybean Board, US
- Universal Studios Beijing, China
- Université de Saint-Boniface, Winnipeg, Manitoba, Canada

== See also ==
- USB hardware
- USB hub
- Wireless USB
- USB flash drive
