= Tee-ball =

Children's team sport

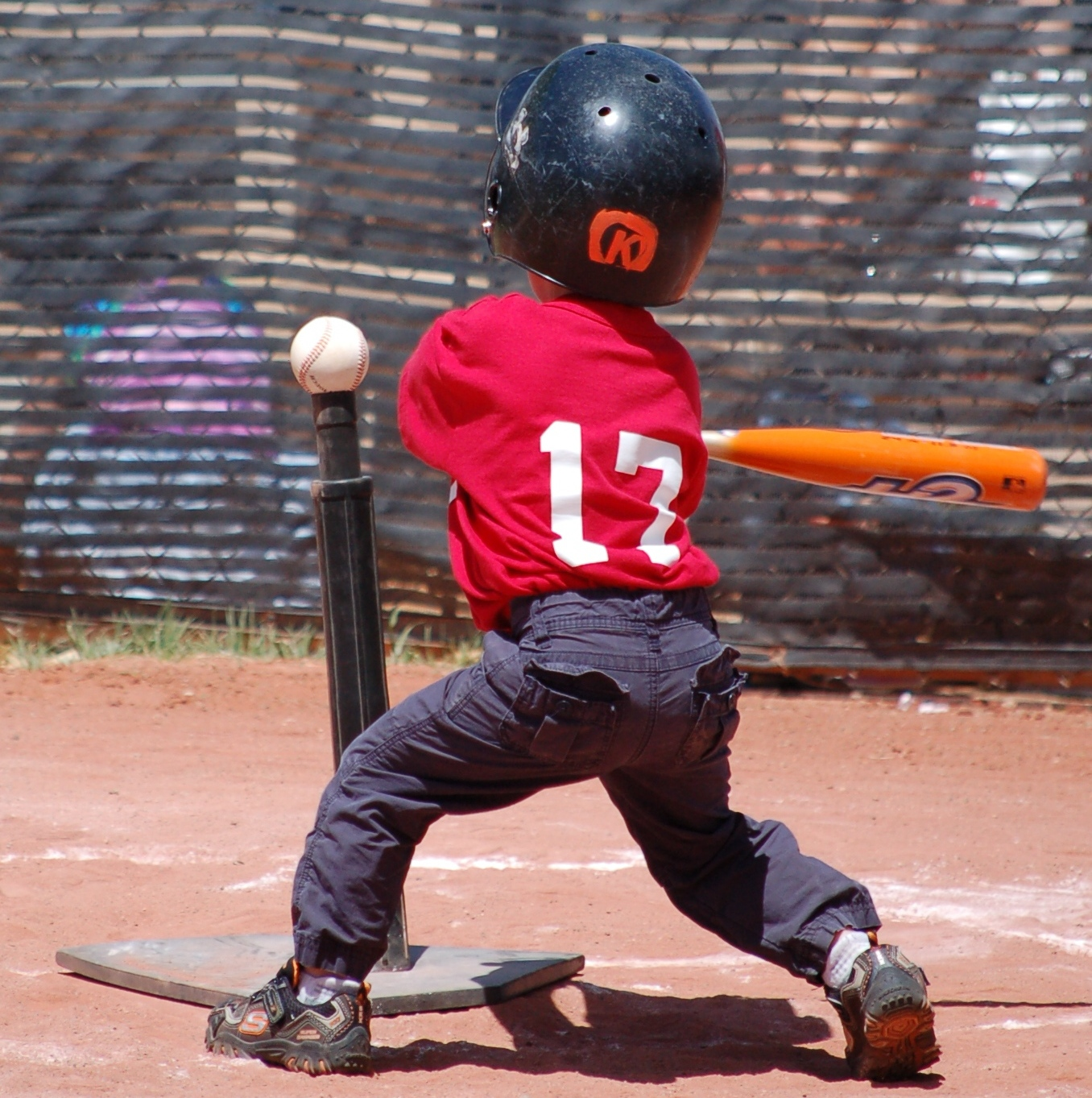
A tee-ball player swings at a ball resting on the tee.

Tee-ball (also teeball, tee ball or T-ball) is a team sport based on a simplified form of baseball or softball. It is intended as an introduction for children to develop bat-and-ball game skills and have fun.

== Description ==
Tee-ball associations generally allow children between the ages of four and seven to play in their leagues. A tee-ball coach sets the team lineup and fielding positions in the team's scorebook. The positions that get the most action in tee-ball are pitcher and first base, followed by the rest of the infield positions. In some leagues, catcher is also a special position due to the added gear that is worn; in other leagues, there is no catcher. In tee-ball, the pitcher is usually used for defensive purposes only, though gently pitched balls may be used with older or more advanced players in place of the fixed tee. The ball is placed on an adjustable tee atop the home plate at a suitable height for the batter to strike. (In some clubs, adult coaches give the batter an opportunity to try to hit a few pitched balls before going to the tee in the hope that this will further develop batting skills.) Most of the other rules are similar or identical to those of baseball, though the game is played on a smaller field, typically one used for Little League or other youth baseball. In addition, for the youngest tee-ball players, runs and outs are often not recorded, and every player gets to bat each inning.

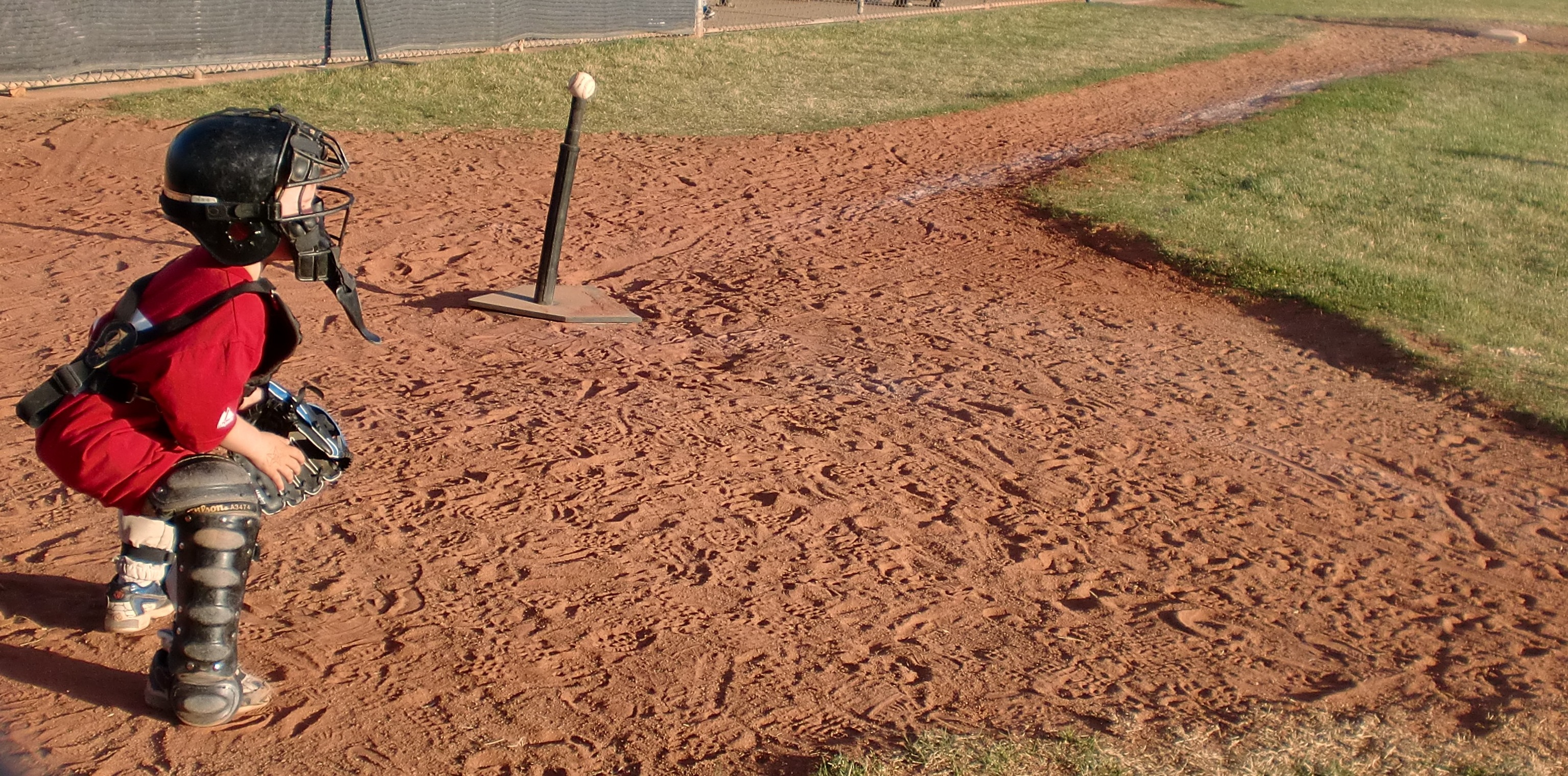
A young catcher crouches behind the tee.

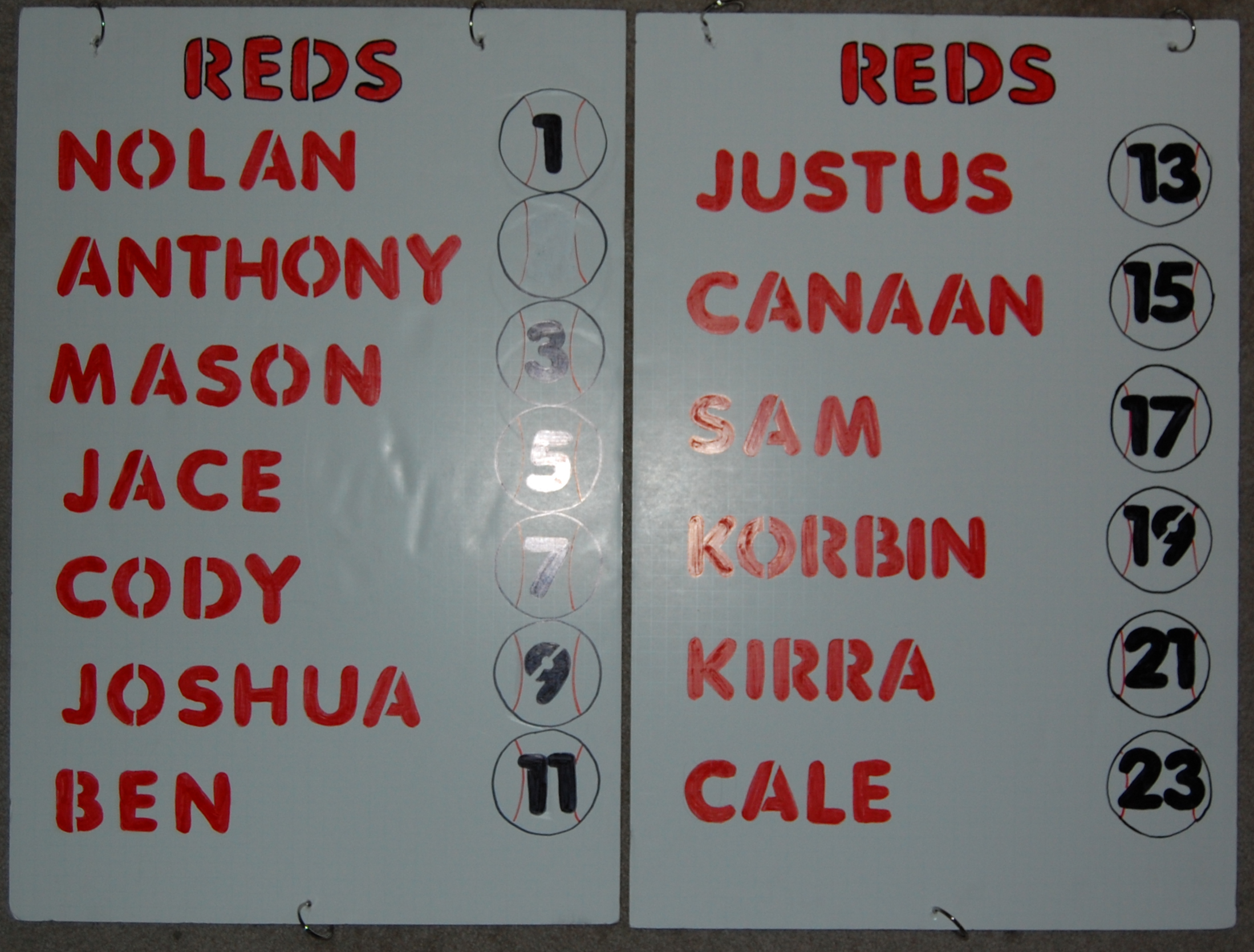
Example tee-ball roster sign that is displayed so the fans can cheer the kids by name.

Many parents assist during the game by coaching players in the dugout, in the field, on the bases, and at the plate. They often also perform the task of umpiring.

== Equipment specifications ==
Bats: 25 to 26 inches long, 2.25 inches diameter, maximum weight 17 to 20 oz.

Balls: typically appear identical to baseballs, but slightly softer to reduce injuries: 9 to 9.5 inches around, 4 to 5 oz weight, with a molded core or sponge rubber center.

Footwear: Athletic footwear such as running shoes.

Gloves: 12 inches long maximum.

Safety helmets: Mandatory at all times.

Tee: Height-adjustible, flexible tube, with a movable base.

== History ==
The game's origins date back to at least the 1950s, with several people claiming to be the father of the game, and it appears to have been independently invented in several places. Albion, Michigan is the place of invention of the sport, in 1956, by Jerome Sacharski. Claude Lewis, director of the Warner Robins, Georgia, Recreation Department, formed a tee-ball league in March 1958, in which 20 children played the first year. Lewis designed rules for the new game and mailed the rule books out to recreation departments all over the country and overseas. Nevertheless, the city of Starkville, Mississippi, claims to have independently created tee-ball in 1961. According to the Starkville Rotary Club's website: "In 1961, when it was apparent that younger children needed some way to participate in the program, Rotarians Clyde Muse and W. W. Littlejohn devised the game of "t-ball" and added it to the summer baseball program."

A "Tee Ball" trademark was filed in April of 1971 and subsequently registered in February of 1973 with the United States Patent and Trademark Office by Robert Dayton Hobbs (1924–2006), the pastor of a fundamentalist Christian church he founded in Milton, Florida, and also the organizer in the late 1950s of the first organized youth baseball program in Santa Rosa County, Florida. Hobbs's "Tee Ball" trademark was still asserted by Gospel Projects, Inc., of Milton, Florida, at least as of 2009 (last year of publication of their "Tee Ball Baseball Organization Rules").

Hobbs credited the United States Navy with spreading the game overseas.

It is estimated that 2.2 million children play tee-ball.

In the "White House Tee Ball Initiative", U.S. president George W. Bush hosted tee-ball games on the South Lawn of the White House.

== United States ==
=== T-Ball USA Association ===
A non-profit governing body exists in the United States, the T-Ball USA Association, of West Palm Beach, Florida. It is a national member of USA Baseball, a partner of the International Baseball Federation (IBAF), and its principal officers are members of the National Council of Youth Sports. The association publishes a summarized basic rule-set and field requirements, and supports local parks and recreation departments, youth activity clubs and baseball leagues, military bases's youth programs, and independent parent-administered leagues. The organization also arranges events, including tee-ball team attendance at Major and Minor League baseball games, and the MLB All-Star Game FanFests. Their stylized "T•BALL USA" logo "identifies the projects and programs created to support the national tee ball constituency and marks licensed and approved products, corporate sponsorships and appropriate alliances."

== In Australia ==
Tee-ball is a popular sport for Australian primary school children. An estimated 60% of Australian primary schools include tee-ball in their sports programs and 17,000 children play in organised competitions. 2017 research found 10.6% of 6–13 year-olds regularly play tee-ball, making it the 14th most popular children's sport in Australia. This does not appear to translate into increased participation in baseball and softball which are not popular sports for teenagers older than 14.

== See also ==
- Baseball5 – a similar game where batters hit with their hand
