= UBOS =

UBOS may refer to:

- Ultimate Book of Spells, a Canadian animated television series
- Uganda Bureau of Statistics, a government agency
