= Italian entertainment awards =

This list describes the most notable entertainment Italian awards for theater, cinema, television, music and fashion. The more important are the Ubu Awards for theater, the David of Donatello for cinema, the Premio Regia Televisiva for television, the Sanremo Music Festival for music and Miss Italia for fashion and beauty.

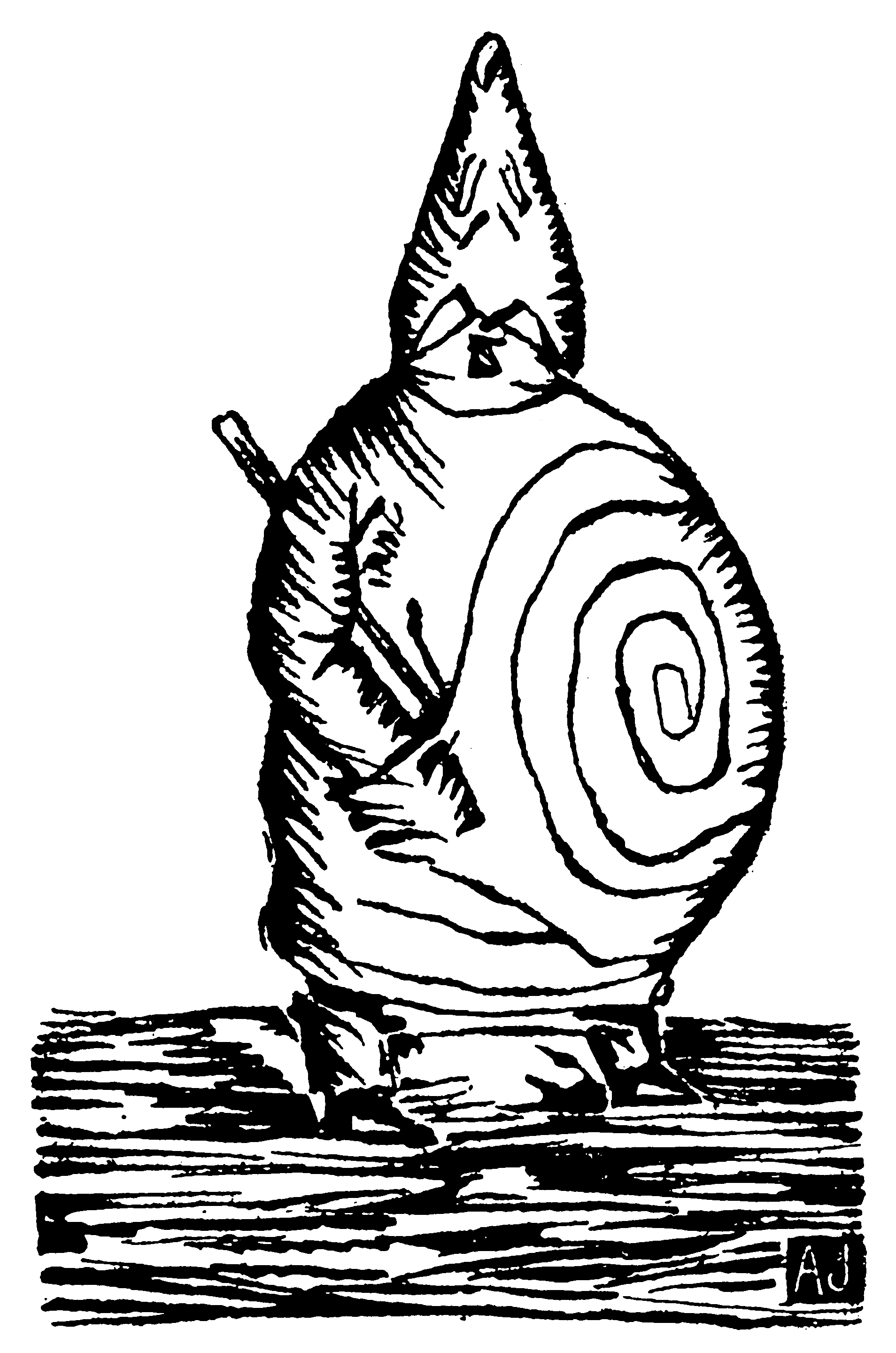
Logo of Ubu Awards

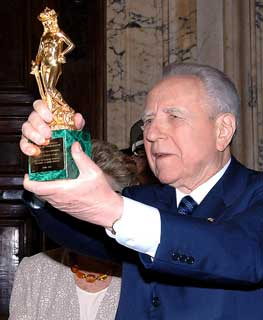
Ciampi with a David statuette

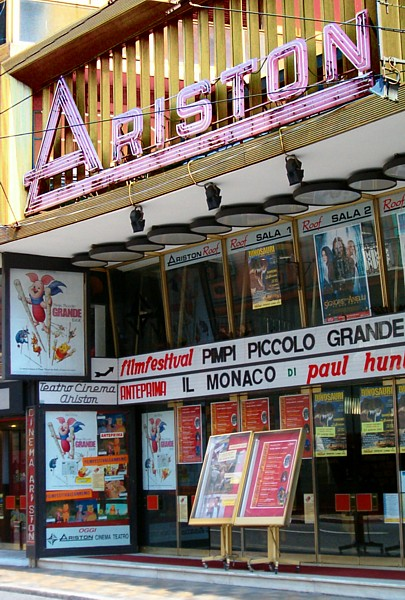
The Teatro Ariston hosts the Sanremo Music Festival.

== Theater ==
- Ubu Awards

== Cinema ==
- David di Donatello
- Nastro d'Argento
- Leone d’oro
- Ciak d'oro
- Grolla d'oro
- Globo d'oro

=== International Film Festivals ===
- Venice Film Festival
- Turin Film Festival
- International Rome Film Festival
- Taormina Film Fest

== Television ==
- Premio Regia Televisiva
- Telegatto

== Music ==
- Sanremo Music Festival Awards (numerous awards; twenty in 2013)
- Rassegna Italiana Canzone d'autore (Premi Tenco and Targhe Tenco)
- Premio Lunezia
- Wind Music Awards (born by defunct awards Festivalbar and Italian Music Awards)
- Sanremo Hits Awards
- Summer Music Awards
- Premio Videoclip Italiano
- Premio Roma Videoclip
- Castrocaro Music Festival
- Disco Norba
- TRL Awards
- Venice Music Awards
- MTV Europe Music Awards (for all countries of European Union)
- Eurovision Song Contest (for all countries of European Union: the most important European awards)

== Fashion and beauty ==
- Miss Italia
- Miss Italia nel Mondo
- Miss Italia Regional
- Miss Italia Special Awards

== See also ==
- Italian estimated best-selling music artists
