= German Type UB submarine =

German Type UB submarine may refer to:

- German Type UB I submarine of WW1
- German Type UB II submarine of WW1
- German Type UB III submarine of WW1

== See also ==
- German submarine UB of WW2
