= Cal Ripken's Real Baseball =

2003 video game

Cal Ripken's Real Baseball
- Developer: NCK Tiger Electronic Handheld Studios
- Publisher: Netamin Communication Corporation
- Engine: Virtual Reality Environment Engine; EMotion FX (Q3 2008)
- Platform: Windows
- Release: 2003
- Genre: Baseball MMOSG
- Mode: Multiplayer

Cal Ripken's Real Baseball, also known as Real Baseball Online or Ultimate Baseball Online, was the first free-to-play baseball based massively multiplayer online sports game (MMOSG). Operating from 2003 until 2008, the game was developed and published by American company Netamin Communication Corporation. The game was designed to allow 18 human-controlled players to compete simultaneously in virtual game, though the number was later reduced due to lag issues. Former Major League Baseball player Darrell Evans served as the game's spokesperson/ambassador prior to Cal Ripken's endorsement of the game. After it ceased operation in 2008, a fan-led open source project was attempted before Real Baseball's successor, Big League Online, was released for beta testing in early 2011.

== Development and history ==
Netamin Communication Corporation was the developer behind Real Baseball Online, with the company having been founded in 1999. Netamin became the world's first company to develop the technology to build a Massively Multiplayer Online Sports Game (MMSOG), led by its founder and CEO (Chief Entertainment Officer), Andy Wang. The game entered live Beta testing in April 2004 and late in its development was associated with Disney/ESPN. Former Major League Baseball player Darrell Evans served as the game's "Ambassador" for the majority of its history until shortly after the ESPN deal was signed. After the release of Ultimate Baseball Online 2006 (known simply as UBO), the game had officially ended its Beta phase. Netamin announced a monthly subscription fee for UBO in September 2006, consisting of a $7.95 monthly fee for early adopters and a $9.95 monthly charge for new players. The subscription fee was met with negative reaction by players, prompting Netamin to create a new season and league system, while making the game free to play for those only participating in pickup baseball games.

The game still had its share of bugs and other issues, as explained in the download page on CNET.com. Even though Disney/ESPN insisted the game get visual face lift, this introduced more problems than it solved and ultimately led to the game's demise. Players angry over the subscription fees lashed out at what were known as "General Managers" or "GM's", people who worked for Netamin who overlooked games and tournaments online on the games message boards. Player reception to paid service led Netamin to try to find other ways to attract players and defray costs, eventually leading to in-game advertising.

Netamin offered discounts to players who signed up for six months or one year subscriptions and gave away free months of subscriptions for winning in tournaments but nothing lured large enough numbers of players. Netamin then tried to offer new players a limited time free play where they could download and play the game for free, but once they reached a certain level were forced to pay if they wanted to continue. This also failed, and Netamin was at a loss to gain subscriptions. With seasoned players leaving the game and new player not sticking around to pay for the game, Netamin was forced to end subscription fees and once again offer the game to play for free.

Although there are still some things to be worked out, there is enormous potential. Major plusses[sic] for the game are that for one, the download is free (as opposed to paying a $40 fee just to obtain the game), you can play as many pickup games and build up your character as you see fit without cost, but now you can also join a pay league and win some decent prizes.

— Review of Ultimate Baseball Online 2006 by Dan Clarke of GameShark.com

== Gameplay ==
Real Baseball was a massively multiplayer online sports game capable of fielding up to 18 players a game, occupying all active positions in the game of baseball. However, players often refuse to field 18 due to lag and synchronization issues, and games rarely ended with all their original participants. This prompted a later revision in the game where Netamin only allowed ten human players total between two competing teams. Game characters are based on a level of ranks for a specific range of levels, from 0-99, with 99 being the maximum level attained. The game-coded team names of Home and Away teams are used instead of the player created team names; therefore, players can play with each other in normal servers regardless of the team they belong. Servers are divided by players under level 10 and over level 11. Team play is only enforced however, as expected, in Team Tournaments and the UBO League. Game settings also allows the option day and night of three, six, and nine inning games, with extra innings if necessary in two stadiums.

Batting power was supposed to be amplified through the addition of parameter points in body strength and stamina. Stamina was never implemented.

=== RBO League ===

Real Baseball Online (RBO) hosted seasonal leagues that featured multiple teams of different levels playing against each other for the championship. Managed by Netamin and Game Masters, there were three league classes: MVP, All-Star, and Major. Current Leagues include a 10-game regular season for all participating teams, 3-game wildcard playoffs, 4-game division finals, and a 5-game league championship for eligible teams. Press Coverage and Awards are also presented during the league seasons written by the official RBO players who are better off writing than playing the game. Winners of RBO Leagues qualified for the Best of RBO competition, which never took place.

=== RBO Promotions ===
Hats, shirts, pens, keychains, and Darrell Evans autographed baseballs were given away as prizes for entering tournaments. Pay to play tournaments were added to fund prizes for the teams who entered. In-game advertisements were later added to fund future prizes such as "The Best of UBO" tournament that never happened. Players were also able to purchase higher leveled characters in the game. Past prizes included iPods, PSP's, Tickle Me Elmo dolls, Domino's Pizza, Michael J. Fox Bobbleheads, Giftcards, and level upgrades.

== Reception ==
The game received a variety of press coverage, and some differing opinions about the game. Specifically for UBO 2006, GameShark rated it a "B−", while Operation Sports rated the game an "8". Additional reviews and press coverage included:

- Amped News
- Game Daily
- Game Spy
- GamesIndustry.biz

== Shutdown and baseball MMOSG future ==
The service for Cal Ripken's Real Baseball is currently halted until further notice. We apologize for any inconvenience.

— Statement posted on Real Baseball's webpage after the game shut down

Real Baseball Online became inaccessible to play in October 2008. The main webpage of Real Baseball posted a statement saying, "The service for Cal Ripken's Real Baseball is currently halted until further notice. We apologize for any inconvenience." Not long after, Netamin's own corporate webpage ceased to exist, cementing the demise of the game. A fan-initiated open-source project titled Multiplayer Baseball Online was in active development from about early 2009 until mid-2010, when the project was halted. Sometime during 2010 a new company carried over the previous Real Baseball game into a new endeavor called Big League Online. Big League Online soon went down as well, as nothing has been heard from the developers in over a year.
