= Non-English-based programming languages =

Non-English-based programming languages are programming languages that do not use keywords taken from or inspired by English vocabulary.

== Prevalence of English-based programming languages ==
The use of the English language in the inspiration for the choice of elements, in particular for reserved words (keywords) in computer programming languages and code libraries, represents a significant trend in the history of language design. According to the HOPL online database of languages, out of the 8,500+ programming languages recorded, roughly 2,400 of them were developed in the United States, 600 in the United Kingdom, 160 in Canada, and 75 in Australia. Thus, over a third of all programming languages have been developed in countries where English is the primary language. This does not account for the usage share of each programming language, situations where a language was developed in a non-English-speaking country but used English to appeal to an international audience (see the case of Python from the Netherlands, Ruby from Japan, and Lua from Brazil), and situations where it was based on another programming language which used English.

== International programming languages ==
The concept of international-style programming languages was inspired by the work of British computer scientists Christopher Strachey, Peter Landin, and others. It represents a class of languages of which the line of the algorithmic languages ALGOL was exemplary.

=== ALGOL 68 ===
ALGOL 68's standard document was published in numerous natural languages. The standard allowed the internationalization of the programming language. On December 20, 1968, the "Final Report" (MR 101) was adopted by the Working Group, then subsequently approved by the General Assembly of UNESCO's IFIP for publication. Translations of the standard were made for Russian, German, French, Bulgarian, and then later Japanese. The standard was also available in Braille. ALGOL 68 went on to become the GOST/ГОСТ-27974-88 standard in the Soviet Union.

- GOST 27974-88 Programming language ALGOL 68 – Язык программирования АЛГОЛ 68
- GOST 27975-88 Programming language ALGOL 68 extended – Язык программирования АЛГОЛ 68 расширенный

In English, Algol68's case statement reads case ~ in ~ out ~ esac. In Russian, this reads выб ~ в ~ либо ~ быв.

=== Citrine ===
Localization is the core feature of the Citrine Programming Language. Citrine is designed to be translatable to every written human language. For instance the West Frisian language version is called Citrine/FY. Citrine features localized keywords, localized numbers and localized punctuation. Users can translate code files from one language into another using a string-based approach. At the time of writing, Citrine supports 111 human languages. Support is not limited to well-known languages; all natural human languages up to EGIDS-6 are being accepted for inclusion.

=== Hedy ===
Hedy is an open-source programming language which was developed for programming education. It was designed to be as instructive as possible and as accessible as possible with a few unique features. As of September 2024 it supports 47 different languages, meaning its keywords can be typed in any of those. It supports languages that do not use the Latin alphabet for their keywords and variable names and it also supports more numbering systems than Arabic numerals, like Eastern Arabic numerals. All of these can be used interchangeably. The error messages are quite verbose, explaining what is wrong and what might be a fix.

=== Legesher ===
Legesher is a localization system for the Python programming language that allows code to be written using keywords in a user's native written language. It provides localized Python grammars and editor tooling, allowing programmers to write Python without relying exclusively on English keywords. Legesher's translation system supports adding different natural languages to its programming syntax. It currently supports 50+ languages.

=== Scheme ===
While internationalization is not a part of any Scheme standard, the expressiveness and flexibility of the language allows for the addition of internationalization as a library. International Scheme is an open source project to which anyone can contribute a translation. Since translations of Scheme can be loaded as libraries, Scheme programs can be multilingual.

=== Scratch ===
Scratch is a block-based educational language. The text of the blocks is translated into many languages, and users can select different translations. Unicode characters are supported in variable and list names. (Scratch lists are not stored inside variables the way arrays or lists are handled in most languages. Variables only store strings, numbers, and, with workarounds, Boolean values, while lists are a separate data type that store sequences of these values.) Projects can be "translated" by simply changing the language of the editor, although this does not translate the variable names.

=== GTlang ===
GTLang – a multilingual programming language designed to allow code to be written and read using native languages rather than primarily English keywords. It supports localized syntax and multiple natural language keyword sets, making it accessible to learners and users familiar with languages such as Spanish, French, Russian, and Japanese. Official documentation and source code are available on the GTLang website and GitHub.

=== UniversalPython ===
UniversalPython is an experimental multilingual programming language designed to allow programs written in a Python-like syntax to be transpiled into almost any natural human written languages. The project aims to reduce the dependency on English keywords in programming by enabling code translation into various written languages while maintaining compatibility with Python-style semantics. The language and its tooling are available as open-source software on GitHub.

== Based on non-English languages ==
Programming languages based on human languages other than English
Basis	Name	Description	Link
Alsatian	Alsatran	A version of Fortran with keywords and built-in identifiers all translated to Alsatian.	
Amharic	AxumLight / Geez#	Amharic-based programming language on the .NET platform	
Amharic	BunnaScript	A multilingual JavaScript and TypeScript programming language that enables writing computer code in the user's native language. Currently supports Amharic language.	
Arabic	Al-Khawarizm	Middle-level language for system programming with custom IDE. Intended for professional purpose. Supports Windows and Linux platforms. First design and development in 2008. Development status: active.	
Arabic	Jeem	Arabic procedural programming language that uses features from both C and Pascal. Supports simple graphics. Intended for educational purposes. Developed by Mohammad Ammar Alsalka. Released in 2006.	
Arabic	ARLOGO	An open-source language based on the UCB Logo interpreter.	
Arabic	Ebda3	A multi-paradigm high-level programming language.	
Arabic	Qalb	A Scheme-like programming language.	
Arabic	Kalimat	A programming language that aims to help Arab children learn about programming.	
Arabic	Ammoria	Object-oriented language	
Arabic	Loughaty (MyProLang)	A general-purpose natural Arabic programming language based on a proprietary syntax.	
Arabic	Phoenix	A C-like high-level imperative procedural language.	
Arabic	Seen	A Bilingual English/Arabic based language that transpiles to Rust.	
Azerbaijani	Nasimi	An Azerbaijani implementation of Python.	
Bengali	ChaScript	Built using ECMAScript grammar.	
Bengali	Kalpana	An open-source, multilingual dual-paradigm interpreted programming language based on Bangla.	
Chinese	Chinese BASIC	Chinese-localized BASIC dialects based on Applesoft BASIC; for Taiwanese Apple II clones and the Multitech Microprofessor II.	
Chinese	ChinesePython (ZhPy)	A version of Python with keywords and built-in identifiers all translated to Chinese.	
Chinese	Easy Programming Language	A Chinese rapid application development language.	
Chinese	Wenyan	An esoteric language that closely follows the grammar and sentence structure of Classical Chinese; it compiles to JavaScript and Python (with C, etc. forthcoming).	wenyan-lang on GitHub
Czech and Slovak	Karel	An educational programming language with Czech and Slovak versions.	
Dutch	Superlogo	Created for computer-aided instruction, based on Logo.	
Dutch	Drama	An assembly language for educational purposes.	
Finnish	sampo	An educational Forth-like programming language used in the 1980s by a high school in the city of Oulu.	
Finnish	Tampio	Made to look like a natural language. Object-oriented.	tampio on GitHub
French	GOTO++	An esoteric programming language loosely based on French and English.	
French	Linotte		
French	LSE (Language Symbolique d'Enseignement)	A pedagogical programming language designed in the 1970s at the École Supérieure d'Électricité. A kind of BASIC, but with procedures, functions, and local variables, like in Pascal.	
French	BASICOIS	BASIC with French keywords	
French	SPIP	Templating language with French syntax	
French	WLangage	WinDev programming language	
French	Rouille	Rust translated into French	rouille on GitHub
German	Teuton	A German implementation of Python.	
German	Schlange	Another German implementation of Python.	
German	Robot Karol	A 3D implementation and German translation of Karel used for educational purposes in secondary education.	
Greek	Glossa	Based on Pascal, used for educational purposes in secondary education.	
Greek	M2000	Programming Environment using Greek and or English Keywords. Basic like language (interpreter) with over 500 Keywords, including OOP, Threads, Events, Lambda Functions.	List of BASIC dialects, Environment on GitHub
Hausa	Hapy	Hausa Programming language that compiles to Python, for educational purposes.	
Hebrew	TamliLogo	A Hebrew implementation of Logo.	
Hebrew	Genesis	An esoteric programming language based on "Paleo-Hebrew".	
Hebrew	Codesh (קודש)	An esoteric programming language whose syntax is modeled after the Hebrew Bible.	, The Motzie B'She'ela on GitHub
Hindi	OM Lang	OM Lang is a multilingual, statically typed programming language that supports more than 9+ Indian languages. OM Lang is very similar to GO, C and Rust. It has its own interpreter and compiler.	,
Hindi	Bharat programming language	A Hindi programming language with core functionality like loops, function, classes, and structures. Its interpreter is written in Python, and can be installed locally or used online.	
Hindi	Bhailang	Bhailang is a dynamically typed toy programming language based on an inside joke, written in TypeScript.	
Hindi	Hindi Programming Language	A Hindi programming language for the .NET Framework.	
Hindi	W language	A Hindi translated HTML language	w language on GitHub
Hindi	Hindi, Bengali, Gujarati	Hindawi Programming System	A set of variants of C, C++, lex, yacc, assembly, BASIC, and Logo
Icelandic	Fjölnir	An imperative programming language from the 1980s.	
Indonesian	BAIK	C with Indonesian keywords.	BAIK on SourceForge
Irish	Setanta	High level general purpose language that runs in the browser. Contains a graphics API that can be used to make games and animations	
Italian	CadregaLisp	A Lisp dialect based a comedian sketch of Aldo Giovanni and Giacomo	on GitHub
Italian	GomorraSQL	A SQL dialect based upon the Italian series Gomorrah	on GitHub
Italian	Monicelli	An esoteric programming language based upon the so-called "Supercazzola" of the movie My Friends	monicelli on GitHub
Japanese	Dolittle	Developed for educational purposes. Freeware.	
Japanese	Himawari (ひまわり)	Succeeded by Nadeshiko. Freeware.	
Japanese	Kotodama (ことだま) on Squeak	Based on Squeak. For educational purposes.	
Japanese	Mind	A variant of FORTH. Commercial.	
Japanese	Nadeshiko (なでしこ)	Successor of Himawari. Open source freeware. Chosen (along with MIT Scratch) in one of the 3 official textbooks of technical arts for junior high schools in Japan, from 2022.	
Japanese	Produire	An object-oriented Japanese programming language. Successor of TTSneo. Freeware.	
Japanese	TTSneo	A Japanese programming language. Succeeded by Produire. Freeware.	
Japanese	Unchiku (うんちく)	A Japanese programming language. Has limited functions/operations. Developed for educational purposes.	
Javanese	sawa	A Javanese translated Python language.	sawa on GitHub
Korean	Ssiat (씨앗)	A language using Hangul (Korean). The name Ssiat (씨앗) means "seed" in Korean.	
Korean	Aheui (아희)	An esoteric programming language similar to Befunge but using Hangul	
Korean	Changjo (창조)	A language using Hangul. It is used for multimedia and game programming.	
Korean	hForth	A Forth system with an optional Korean keyword set.	
Latin	Lusus		
Latin	Lingua::Romana::Perligata	Alternative Syntax for Perl 5 that allows programming in Latin.	
Latvian	LVskripts	Javascript translated into Latvian.	on GitHub
Latvian	Dzintars	Ruby translated into Latvian.	dzintars on GitHub
Latvian	Priede	Interpreted high-level language. Name means pine in latvian.	priede on GitHub
Lithuanian	Setonas	Python translated into Lithuanian.	setonas on GitHub
Malay	Malaybasic	BASIC with Malay keywords	
Malayalam	Thengascript	A dialect of JavaScript in the Malayalam language.	
Malayalam	Malluscript	An esoteric scripting language made with Rust based on Manglish with an aim to provide inclusivity and diversity in programming.	
Nehiyawewin/Cree	Ancestral Code (Cree#)	An IDE and language based on the Nehiyaw (Cree) language and cultural storytelling practice.	
Persian	Farsinet	An object-oriented programming language for .NET Framework. It is similar to C# and Delphi.	
Persian	Kharazmi	A Persian programming language and IDE designed to teach programming to middle school students, similar to Pascal	
Persian	Zangar	Zangar (Persian for Rust) allows you to write Rust programs in Persian, using Persian keywords and function names. It is adapted from Rouille, the original French implementation of Rust.	zangar on GitHub
Persian	Kati (زبان کاتی)	An online programming language in Persian language.	
Persian	Hashemi (آقای هاشمی)	forked from "SimpleLanguage" that is a simple example language built using the Truffle API.	mr-hashemi on GitHub
Persian	Simorgh (SPL)	SPL has been invented with the aim that non-technical people would be able to produce their own portable applications which can be written in their own native language.	
Polish	AC-Logo	Logo with Polish commands IDŹ, OTO, NAPRZÓD etc. created in 1992	
Polish	SAKO	A language created in the 1950s and nicknamed the "Polish Fortran"	
Polish	EOL	Expression-Oriented Language allowed for the use of both Polish and English keywords.	
Polish	Zdzich	Amateur programming language for DOS.	
Polish	AlexScript	A general purpose interpreted language with Polish syntax	
Portuguese	Delégua	A general purpose programming language, for educational and commercial purposes.	
Portuguese	VisuAlg	A language designed to teach programming, based on Pascal.	
Portuguese	potigol	A functional programming language in Portuguese for beginners.	
Portuguese	Portugol	A programming language with Portuguese keywords.	
Portuguese	Portugol Studio	A variation of Portugol that based in C and PHP for learning purposes.	
Portuguese	G-Portugol	A variation of Portugol.	gpt on GitHub
Portuguese	NPortugol	A .NET Programming language for embedded scripts. A variation of Portugol.	
Russian	1C:Enterprise	A framework and language for business applications. English keywords can also be used.	
Russian	РАПИРА	An interpreted procedural programming language with strong dynamic type system.	
Russian	Аналитик	A language for symbolic manipulations with algebraic expressions used in the Soviet series of MIR computers.	
Russian	Эль-76	A language for symbolic manipulations with algebraic expressions used in the Soviet series of Elbrus computers.	
Russian	ЯМБ	ЯМБ (язык машин бухгалтерских) (machine language for accounting machines) – A Russian programming language for Iskra-554, Iskra-555, and Neva-501 specialized accounting computers.	
Russian	КуМир	Similar to Pascal and IDE, mainly intended for educational usage in schools. The name is an acronym, which means Комплект ученический 'Мир' ('Mir' student's environment).	
Russian	KuMir	A programming language and programming system designed to support introductory courses in computer science and programming in secondary and higher education.	
Russian	Робик	A simple language for teaching the basics of programming to children.	
Russian	ЯАП	A language used on Nairi	
Russian	АЛМИР-65	A language used on MIR	
Russian	УАЯ	A language to study programming	
Russian	ХУЯ	A language to study programming	
Sanskrit	OM Lang	A statically typed, multilingual programming language with first-class support for Sanskrit. It claims to be the world's first Sanskrit programming language, offering Sanskrit keywords and syntax. The language aims to experiment with using Sanskrit in programming.	
Serbian	Ћ плус плус	Ћ плус плус (Serbian, "C plus plus") is a JavaScript like programming language based on Cyrillic script	
Sinhala	Ceylonicus	An interpreted programming language with interchangeable English and Sinhala keywords, implemented in Python, and with a web-based environment built with Brython.	Source Code Ceylonicus Source Code on GitHub,
Spanish	GarGar	A procedural programming language based on Pascal for learning purposes.	
Spanish	Vainilla	A pseudocode interpreter for Spanish that runs in the browser.	
Spanish	PSeInt	A pseudocode interpreter for Spanish, like Pascal, with a completely Spanish-based syntax. PSeInt is an abbreviation for Pseudocode Interpreter.	
Spanish	Qriollo	An impure strict functional programming language that compiles to C, Python, and JVM Bytecode, with keywords in Rioplatense Spanish, spoken in Buenos Aires.	
Spanish	Latino	A language with a completely Spanish-based syntax.	
Spanish	Sí	A direct translation pseudo-language for coding in C and C++ with Spanish keywords.	
Spanish	Pauscal	A language with a completely Spanish-based syntax; compiler for 32-bit Windows.	
Spanish	InformATE	A translation of Inform, used for creating text-based games.	
Spanish	EsJS	An interpreted programming language with Spanish syntax, based on JavaScript.	, esjs on GitHub
Swahili	swap	Swahili Programming Language; it is an educational programming language built over Nodejs, It was built as way to help Swahili speakers to easily grasp the concept of coding and programming in general.	
Swedish	Enkelt	A language with a completely Swedish-based syntax. Transpiled to Python.	
Tagalog	Bato	Ruby translated into Tagalog.	bato on GitHub
Tamil	Ezhil	Developed for educational purposes.	
Tamil	eTamil	eTamil is a Tamil-first programming language ecosystem for building modern applications in: Finance & Banking: Develop financial applications, payment systems, transaction processing engines, and fintech solutions using Tamil-based programming constructs.; Accounting Systems: Build general ledger, ERP, taxation, auditing, payroll, and financial reporting applications with native Tamil identifiers.; Blockchain & Smart Contracts: Create decentralized applications (DApps), digital asset platforms, blockchain networks, and smart contracts using Tamil-centric development.; Modern Developer Ecosystem: Uses a keyboard-friendly ASCII encoding that simplifies compilation, tooling, AI integration, and cross-platform deployment.	eTamil on GitHub
Tamil	Swaram	A simple, general-purpose and procedural language.	
Tamil	Agaram	A simple, Tamil programming language with interpreter and compiler.	Agaram-programming-language on GitHub
Tamil	Niral	A Tamil programming language with Tamil & Latin script.	
Tamil	Thendral	Thendral is a transpiler - Translates thendral ( a scripting language in Tamil ) to valid JavaScript	thendral on GitHub
Tamil	Maghilchi	It is an interpreted language with a natural language-like syntax with Tamil words.	
Tamil	W language	HTML translation in Tamil language	w language on GitHub
Turkish	Yakamoz	A Turkish implementation similar to that of Python.	
Turkish	Kip	A programming language based on grammatical cases of Turkish. Pure function type signatures are Turkish noun phrases, effectful function signatures are verb phrases in infinitive.	kip on GitHub
Urdu	UrduScript	A dialect of JavaScript.	
Welsh	Draig	A Welsh implementation of Raku	
Yoruba	Yorlang	Built on top of Node.js.	
Various	Logo	In one of its Apple II editions, it was available in French. A version used in Bulgarian education with Bulgarian Apple II clones was translated in Bulgarian. LOGO for the Commodore 64 had an Italian localization.	
Various	4th Dimension	On local versions, its internal language uses French or German keywords.	
Various	FOCAL	Keywords were originally in English, but DEC produced versions of FOCAL in several European languages.	
Various	Mama	An educational programming language and development environment, designed to help young students start programming by building 3D animations and games. It is currently available in English, Hebrew, Yiddish, and Chinese.	
Various	MS Word and MS Excel	Their macro languages used to be localized in non-English languages.	
Various	ML4	A language for client/server database programming, with keywords in English or German.	
Various	RoboMind	An educational programming language available in Arabic, Chinese, Dutch, English, French, German, Greek, Polish, Brazilian Portuguese, Spanish, Swedish, and Turkish.	
Various	Scratch	An introductory visual programming language from MIT's Media Lab with support for programming in multiple languages included as standard.	
Various	Catrobat	A visual programming language targeted at teenagers with support for more than 60 languages like Slovenian, Polish, Hindi, German, Romanian, Turkish, Norwegian, Akan, Twi, Hebrew, Chinese Simplified, Indonesian, Swedish, Chinese Traditional, Portuguese, Brazilian, Croatian, Bosnian, Thai, Japanese, Sindhi, Tamil, Swahili, Arabic, Persian, Korean, Serbian (Cyrillic), Serbian (Latin), Bengali, French, Slovak, Vietnamese, Italian, Macedonian, Russian, Portuguese, English, Canada, Czech, Sinhala, Azerbaijani, Kazakh, Dutch, Catalan, Albanian, Pashto, Gujarati, Finnish, Malay, Lithuanian, Malayalam, Danish, Hungarian, Afrikaans, Kannada, Greek, Bulgarian, Galician, Urdu (Pakistan), English, Australia, English, United Kingdom, Telugu, Ukrainian, Hausa and Igbo.	Catroid on GitHub Catty on GitHub
Various	TECO	The programming language used to drive the actions of the TECO text editor. The MIT dialect of this language was used to program early versions of Emacs before its 1985 rewrite in Emacs Lisp.	
Various	TI-Calculator BASIC	The 68000 version is localized. Various configuration strings are localized too, preventing direct binary compatibility.	
Various	Citrine	Programming language that can be used to code in any native human language, includes a translator module to translate code from one human language to another. At the time of writing it supports English, Dutch, Lithuanian and Romanian.	

== Based on symbols instead of keywords ==
- APL – A language based on mathematical notation and abstractions.
- Brainfuck – A minimalist esoteric programming language, created for the purpose of having the smallest possible compiler.
- Emojicode – An esoteric language based on Emojis.
- G – Graphical language used in LabVIEW (not to be confused with G-code).
- Hoon – A systems programming language for Urbit, compiling to Nock.
- J – An APL-like language which uses only ASCII special characters and adds function-level programming.
- Light Pattern – A language which uses a series of photographs rather than text as source code.
- Mouse – A minimalist language created by Peter Grogono which uses ASCII characters for keywords.
- Piet – An art-based esoteric programming language.
- Plankalkül – The first high-level non-von Neumann programming language, designed by Konrad Zuse during World War II in Germany.
- Whitespace – An esoteric language based on whitespace characters (spaces, tabs, and line breaks).

== Modifiable parser syntax ==
- Babylscript – A multilingual version of JavaScript which uses multiple tokenizers to support localized keywords in different languages and which allows objects and functions to have different names in different languages.
- Component Pascal – A preprocessor that translates native-language keywords into English in an educational version of the BlackBox Component Builder available as open source. The translation is controlled via a modifiable vocabulary and supported by modifiable compiler error messages. A complete Russian version is used in education, and it should be possible to accommodate other left-to-right languages (e.g., the Kabardian language has been tried as a proof of concept).
- HyperTalk – A programming language, which allows translation via custom resources, used in Apple's HyperCard.
- IronPerunis – An IronPython 2.7 localization to Lithuanian and Russian.
- AppleScript – A language which once allowed for different "dialects" including French and Japanese; however, these were removed in later versions.
- Maude – Completely user-definable syntax and semantics, within the bounds of the ASCII character set.
- Perl – While Perl's keywords and function names are generally in English, it allows modification of its parser to modify the input language, such as in Damian Conway's Lingua::Romana::Perligata module, which allows programs to be written in Latin, or his Lingua::tlhInganHol::yIghun Perl language in Klingon. They do not just change the keywords but also the grammar to match the language.
- Ioke – Ioke is a folding language. It allows writing highly expressive code that writes code. Examples of same program in Chinese, Danish, Hindi and Spanish

== Sources ==
- Pigott, Diarmuid (2006). "HOPL, the History of Programming Languages". Archived from the original on 2011-02-20.
