= Fjölnir (disambiguation) =

Fjölnir may refer to the following:

- Fjölnir, a Swedish king according to Norse mythology
- Fjölnir (programming language)
- Fjölnir (journal), a former Icelandic-language journal published in Denmark
- Ungmennafélagið Fjölnir, an Icelandic sports club
