= Citrine (disambiguation) =

Citrine is a yellow variety of quartz.

Citrine also commonly refers to:

- Citrine (colour), a shade of yellow

Citrine may also refer to:

== People ==
- Walter Citrine, 1st Baron Citrine (1887–1983), British trade unionist and politician
- Baron Citrine, the hereditary title held by Walter Citrine

== Fictional characters ==
- Charlie Citrine, a character in the book Humboldt's Gift, by Saul Bellow
- Citrine (Xenosaga), a character in the Xenosaga series of video games

== Other uses ==
- Citrine (protein), a type of yellow fluorescent protein
- Citrine (EP), a 2016 album by Hayley Kiyoko
- Citrine (programming language), a programming language for Unix-like operating systems
- Citrine, a commonly used informal name for ABC of Chairmanship by Walter Citrine

== See also ==
- Citrin, a protein
