= MZ-2500 =

Home computer model

The MZ-2500, also known as the Super MZ, is an 8-bit personal computer released on 1 October 1985 as part of the Sharp MZ series. It is a successor to the MZ-2000/2200 and a direct successor to the MZ-80B from the previous generation. The MZ-2000 was a model that was given significant functions, along with a faster processing speed. It is also the final model of the entire 8-bit MZ series with architecture of its kind. It is sometimes referred to as the best 8-bit machine along with the 6809 FM77AV and the MB-S1. In Japanese computer magazines, the MZ-2500 was also called 'The Phoenix'. Its successor was the Sharp MZ-2861 which has a compatible mode and a newly developed 16-bit mode. The development code is LEY and can be found in the circuit diagram.

== Overview ==
=== Sharp MZ ===
As with the standard MZ model, the main unit does not have the system program on onboard ROM. However, while the old model included only the IPL, a program for controlling advanced hardware is included as an IOCS and several repairs have been made. One of the functions can call a specific location, so an incompatible element is specified for an application that addresses the module in the ROM and calls it directly without calling the function as a reference.

=== Two forms of BASIC inserted ===
The instruction set BASIC-S25, which the typical MZ user was familiar with, and the BASIC-M25, which has a Microsoft-type instruction set that was already at the forefront of the BASIC environment at that time, was prepared. It is not a conventional model, and Hu-BASIC was adopted in the company's departmental series but has become another implementation of BASIC.

=== CPU clock improvement ===
The MZ-2500 is equipped with the Z80A and operates at 4 MHz, but the MZ-2500 is equipped with the Z80B, and except for some, it has 6 MHz operation with one wait during the M1 cycle.

=== Memory management enhancements ===
While the old model only allowed one to assign a specific address to another space by bank switching to open a window with text and graphics VRAM, the MZ-2500 is equipped with a memory controller, like the MB-S1, etc. It was designed to be able to allocate an arbitrary space in 8 KB units for a memory space divided into eight. This has made it possible to manage 256 KB of main memory and 128 KB of graphics VRAM, and by enabling free allocation, the software can be mapped by mapping video memory in the same arrangement as other models. The porting of the design address space is 512 KB. Various ROMs and RAMs are arranged in this space.

=== Equipped with Argo Key ===
An Algo function has been added to BASIC due to the aforementioned increase in the degree of freedom of memory mapping and capacity. The Algo function is a key with the mark of the Argo, which is a symbol of the series, that is used as a function to call the built-in application. The "Algo" spelling came from "algorithm". Close to the resident program, apart from the loaded program, it was possible to start a calculator or the like by key operation as a standard.

=== Significant enhancement of CRTC ===
In the standard model, the display peripheral which was a specification that the CPU directly writes to VRAM mapped to the memory space for each plane without having one ALU has been greatly strengthened in the same machine. The number of colors corresponds to an output of 256 colors in the 320x200 mode and 16 colors in the maximum 640x400 mode. Although not defined as a specification, it is also possible to output at a resolution of 320x400 by installing an additional video memory from the design specification of a custom chip. In addition, simultaneous writing is supported for multiple planes, which enables high-speed drawing even for colors across planes. The palette board has evidence added later in the design and is designed to output specified values in 4096 colors as a palette by interrupting the circuit using a high-speed memory when outputting 16 colors. Also, from the implementation, the existence can not be determined from the software side. In addition to them, having a PCG has made it possible to reduce the definition of external characters as well as the background composition processing in games. In addition to the above display functions, the text screen is a vertically smooth scroll. The graphics screen supports vertical and horizontal smooth scrolling. However, since the 256-color mode is not a packed pixel but an array of stacked planes, the display is not suitable for moving anything. Even in this era, the speed of access to the graphic VRAM itself is not fast because there is no mechanism such as cycle steel. In addition, the execution of the program on the graphic VRAM is not guaranteed, and at the time of read modification write, 2 wait is included.

=== Loading of kanji text VRAM ===
Like Sharp's PC-9800 series and X1turbo, it is equipped with Kanji text VRAM. It is possible to display the font up to the second JIS standard only by writing the display code. Processing is much lighter than transferring a font image as a graphic from a kanji ROM, and even though it is an 8-bit machine, it has achieved more comfortable handling of Japanese than models of the same price range.

=== Data recorder installation ===
Similar to conventional models, a software-controllable data recorder is attached. The head itself was in stereo, and one channel was available as a data recorder and the other as an audio track. During the late 1980s to early 1990s, the Japanese home computer market shifted to floppy-based software supply, and the tape drive was used only to the extent that some software required a device to play back recorded audio. It was also possible to use it as an answering machine as well as for voice recording. The tape recorder was installed for compatibility with the old model and was removed in the MZ-2520, which is an inexpensive version that does not have the MZ-80B / 2000 mode.

=== Communication-aware design ===
The MZ-2500 included a serial port and dedicated modem phone socket for "personal computer communication" i.e. to connect to data services online such as BBSes.[1] Terminal software was also included as standard. The combination of the dedicated devices made it possible to use the built-in data recorder also as an answering machine.

== Hardware ==
- With significant additional functions, support for older models is provided by the mode switch.
- In MZ-2000 / 2200, there was a part incompatible with MZ-80B, but in MZ-2500, it became possible to use all the assets of the old model of the series by preparing MZ-80B mode.
- In addition, there is a mode to operate 80 B mode and 2000 mode at 6 MHz as a hidden function, but the reproduction of sound to which CPU speed directly acts and the handling of the data recorder are incompatible.
- The MZ-80B has a green display, but in the 80B mode, the screen is drawn in black and white.
- The same peripheral devices as the previous model can continue to be used, but the 16-bit board can not be used because of the difference in physical shape and design.
- The 3.5-inch FDD has a large vertical width. The operation noise is also relatively large.
- The appearance is configured as a keyboard connected with a curled cord to the main body of a rectangular parallelepiped, and except for MZ-2520, a kangaroo pocket is prepared on the front panel, a resolution switch at startup, and a switch for MZ-2000 / 80B mode, There is slide volume for volume, IPL, and RESET button.
- The joystick is compatible with the ATARI specification, and the mouse is MZ-5500 or X series.
- Since the control of FDD follows the implementation of the old model, since it is necessary to prohibit the interrupt and transfer by software, processing such as accessing without stopping BGM can not be performed.

Four types of models had been released.

The following two models were released as initial models.

- MZ-2511 A model with one built-in FDD. The standard price is 168,000 yen.
- MZ-2521 A model with two built-in FDDs. The standard price is 198,000 yen.

After that, a minor change was made under the name of Super MZ V2 as a model change.

- MZ-2531 A model that added an optional dictionary ROM and additional main memory to the MZ-2521 and added a TV control. Standard price 199,800 yen.

Furthermore, the following models have been released as low-cost versions. The design of the successor MZ-2861 followed that of this model.

- MZ-2520 MZ-2521 specification, remove the data recorder, and the compatibility mode of the old model. The standard price is 159,800 yen.

=== Specification ===
- CPU: Z80B 6 MHz/4 MHz
- RAM:
- With the main 128 KB standard option, 256 KB can be expanded.
- GVRAM: 64 KB included. Up to 128 KB can be added.
- CGRAM: 14 KB Text-VRAM and PCG (Programmable Character Generator) installed.
- ROM:
- IPL / IOCS 32KB
- TELENET 16 KB voice communication interface (MZ-1E26) attached (option)
- Kanji font ROM 256KB-JIS first level, second level
- Dictionary ROM 256 KB (option)-Built-in dictionary for kana-kanji conversion similar to that of the dedicated word processor.
- When the pallet board is installed (option) 16 colors can be displayed in 4096 colors.
- Sound source: YAMAHA YM2203 One built-in. (FM sound source 3ch + SSG sound source 3ch, 8 octaves each + noise 1Ch)

Although BEEP also exists, the combination is difficult because it needs to be directly controlled by Z80. In addition, voice can be uttered by an optional voice board.

- FDD
- The MZ-2520 / 2521/2531 has two 3.5-inch 2DDs
- Only one MZ-2511 is built in.
- Voice recorder
- Button operation and software control possible-Electromagnetic mechanism
- 2-track independent head Analog recording and playback possible
- Data transfer method: Sharp PWM method Data transfer speed: 2000 bits/second
- Power supply: AC100V 50/60 Hz power consumption 50W
- Operating environment: Temperature 10 °C-35 °C, humidity 20%-80% (non-condensing)
- External dimensions
- Body: Width 350 × depth 345 × height 128 (mm)
- Keyboard: Width 410 × depth 196 × height 38 (mm)
- Weight
- Body: Model 20 (MZ-2511) 7.9 kg
- Body: Model 30 (MZ-2521) 8.6 kg
- Keyboard: 1.4 kg
- Display ability
- text

80 lines x 25 lines / 20 lines / 12 lines color 8 colors

40 lines x 25 lines / 20 lines / 12 lines Maximum color (64 colors)

- Graphic VRAM 128 KB time

640 × 400 (4 colors) 1 screen

640 × 200 (16 colors) 1 screen

320 × 200 (16 colors) 2 screens

320 × 200 (256 colors) 1 screen

- Graphic VRAM 256 KB time

640 × 400 (16 colors) 1 screen

640 × 200 (16 colors) 2 screens

320 × 200 (16 colors) 4 screens

In addition to 320 x 200 (256 colors) 2 screens, it is out of specification

320 × 400 (256 colors) 1 screen

== Installed interface ==
- Printer: Centronics standard SHARP specification 25-pin D-Sub connector x 1 port.
- Serial port: RS-232C compliant 25-pin D-Sub x 1 port (A), 9-pin D-Sub x 1 port (B).
- External FDD terminal SHARP specification 37-pin D-Sub x 1 port.
- Joystick: ATARI 9-pin D-Sub x 2 ports.
- Keyboard: Proprietary specification 8-pin mini-DIN connector x 2 ports (exclusive connection of the lower right part of the front panel and the front right side).
- Mouse: SHARP specification 5-pin mini-DIN connector x 2 ports (exclusive connection of the lower right part of the front panel and the front right side).
- Display output terminal CRT: Color (analog/digital switching) 8-pin DIN connector x 1 port, monochrome (analog/digital switching) 5-pin DIN connector x 1 port.
- Display TV control terminal: SHARP standard 8-pin DIN x 1 port.
- Expansion slot x 2 (optional).
- An internal connector for the voice board.
- Voice connector: External connector for dedicated modem phone. 8 pin mini-DIN x 1 port.
- Audio connector: Audio input/output stereo mini-jack (monaural)

== Other ==
- Common to MZ-2500
  - The keyboard has been changed from the conventional arrangement so that the cursor keys are arranged from the horizontal row in the direction of the arrow. The position is located on the ten keys where the keys are densely packed, but it is taller than other keys and can be identified.
- MZ-2511 / 2521 / 2531
  - Kangaroo pocket volumes and buttons are prone to contact failure due to aging.
- MZ-2531 (Super MZ V2)
  - The MZ-2521 (early model) incorporates an additional VRAM, a dictionary ROM, and a television control circuit.
  - The television control circuitry is located at the location of the dictionary ROM, and the board layout has been slightly modified.
  - As for the appearance, three lines were drawn at the position of the FDD on the front panel, the color of the eject button was darkened, and the printing described as MZ-2500 on the top plate disappeared.
  - Bundled software BASIC has become V2.
  - The company's X1tuboZ can display 4096 colors as standard, but 16 of the 4096 colors can be used even with the optional color palette board.
  - The MZ-2520 specifications are equivalent to the MZ-2521 (early model), but the difference in appearance is that the front kangaroo pocket has disappeared, the button attached to the panel has been changed, and the FDD has become thinner. In addition, MZ-2000 / 80B mode, data recorder, one RS-232C port, and a connector of expansion FDD are deleted, and the circuit of replacement of drive No. with built-in FDD etc. is deleted with the deletion of a terminal of FDD. As a result, some incompatible software may not start. In addition, the pallet board became non-compliant.
  - The keyboard connector, MZ-2861, and MZ-25x1 have different shapes, and although the signals are the same, they can not be physically exchanged.
- By activating the IPL while pressing a specific key, you can make detailed specifications.
- Official (owner's manual, MZ-2511 / 2521 included)
    - / Key: Loads and executes a program from the ROM located in the I / O space.
    - E key: Replace the built-in FDD with (FD3, FD4) and the external FDD with (FD1, FD2).
    - R key: RS-232C baud rate (in 2000 and 80 B mode, it can be specified from 19200 bit/s to 150 bit/s. 9600 bit/s automatically if not pressed).
    - C key: Forced activation from cassette deck (even in MZ-2500 mode).
    - 1 key: Force activation from FD1.
    - 2 key: Forced activation from FD2.
    - 3 key: Force boot from FD3.
  - 4 key: Force boot from FD4.
- Informal (information at the time of MZ-2511 / 2521 release) [3] and later models have some of the functionality removed.
    - B key: Perform test (RAM-check) on main RAM and graphic RAM (46 blocks). The judgment result (No / Good) is displayed for each block.
    - G key: Do not clear graphic RAM (do not fill in black). Due to the hardware structure, there is no guarantee that all pixels are completely held.
    - X key: MZ-80B mode (Mode switch is at MZ-2500 position).
  - Z key: MZ-2000 mode (Mode switch is at MZ-2500 position).

== Software ==
During its development and before its release SHARP made a software creation request to videogames developers. However, unlike typical video game system releases there were no major software releases available at launch for the MZ-2500 at the time. Although the MZ-2500's high portability by memory mapping design encouraged porting from other models, few products made use of its unique functions and performance. The MZ series had the habit of building a heavy user base for many years, many of which were homebrew software programs[3] because no commercial software was readily available for the platform.[4] Although there were many commercial software programs available on other system platforms, and despite the MZ-2500 having gained a large share in the market, it did not change the situation for the MZ-2500 series, and commercial software releases for the system eventually fell. In addition, Nintendo released its software for the platform, and Namco (later Bandai Namco Games) ported several software programs from Radio News (microcomputer software).

=== Attached Software ===
==== BASIC M25/S25 ====
BASIC-M25 (MZ-6Z002) is an instruction-type interpreter according to Microsoft -like BASIC, and BASIC-S25 (MZ-6Z003) is BASIC which cherishes the flow of SHARP genuine BASIC derived from PET. These BASICs were included in the same system floppy and could be selected by starting while pressing the HELP key. Converters were also prepared for programs created only in BASIC, and even with the new BASIC, it was possible to convert programs of the previous model incompletely. If the internal codes of BASIC S 25 and M 25 are equivalent to each other, the same instruction is assigned to the intermediate code. Although not as special as X-BASIC, it is possible to use labels including Kanji, as well as line numbers, in addition, to input in abbreviations derived from Hu-BASIC. Indents are compressed and managed in intermediate code, and nesting, conditional branching, etc. can be described over multiple lines, etc. BASIC, is a highly readable, flexible, and more conscious of structural ability. It was possible to write. The Algo function can be set at boot time, and since it was not a genuinely registered tool, etc., there wasn't much-published software, but MZ showed some examples. Depending on the screen mode, smooth scrolling is used in processes involving scrolling, such as directory display and program list display, so that the contents can be easily tracked without stopping the screen. Although there are various factors such as the degree of optimization of the comparison object, in the benchmark in BASIC, it can be said that the interpreter's speed was high at that time, such as thinning to PC-9800 series using 8086 of 8 MHz.

==== Telephone software (MZ-6Z010) ====
Simple communication software. The serial port terminal was attached as standard considering the use of PC communication.

=== System software ===
==== P- CP/M (MZ-6Z001) ====
A portable version of Personal CP/M, which is rare in Japan.

==== MSX-DOS ====
DOS to run Multiplan. It is not sold alone but can read and write MS-DOS format files, but it is a subset of the MSX OS of the same name.

==== S-OS "SWORD" ====
The common system of Z80 was published in Oh! MZ magazine. On many Z80 models, the same binary ran the same application for the same system. The MZ-2500 supports kanji conversion, kanji output, high-resolution display font, etc. in addition to the standard specifications, and an Algo function is also available. Since 2DD disks can not support the entire area according to specifications, they are effectively used by allocating 512 KB to the file system and writing the main part of the system to the remaining part. Other than the MZ-2520, the MZ-80B/2000/2200 version can also be used.

==== FENIX ====
An OS was designed and implemented at the end of the year. There are not so many users as the application is only a development tool. Designed specifically for the same model, it is possible to call the IOCS, and it is possible to start up a standalone binary. Management is performed in memory block units, and if EMM is implemented, it can be swapped to it, and by using it together, it can manage an area of up to 1 MiB in appearance. The command shell has been adopted for the UNIX-like flow.

=== Game software ===
==== Xevious ====
Development, porting by Radio News Agency. By corresponding to the palette board and smooth scroll, the metallic expression by the color scheme using the gradation unique to the game and the smooth scroll of the background are realized. As described above, since the gradation by the palette board supports a large amount, in the 8-color and 16-color modes, there is no big difference between the other models and the still screen, and it can not be said that it is a beautiful screen. Although there is no sprite function, the processing of background composition is

== Notes ==
1. ^ If you want to perform advanced settings, specify the RS-232C baud rate, start drive, internal and external FDD replacement, and start from a special board by activating the IPL while pressing a specific key
2. ^ Compatible mode operates at 4 MHz, but pressing the IPL button while pressing the Z or X key activates the mode of each old model at 6 MHz.
3. ^ Super MZ utilization research 260 pages of BASIC-M25 hidden instruction
