= Stilo (disambiguation) =

Stilo can refer to:

- Stilo town, located in Calabria, Italy.
- Stilo company, developer of the OmniMark software.
- the cape and lighthouse of the same name in Poland.
- Fiat Stilo, compact automobile produced by the Italian manufacturer Fiat from 2001 to 2007.
- Stilo helmets factory, located in Treviolo, Lombardy, Italy and very popular in rallying field.
- A metallic stick to write on clay and wooden tablets.
- Lucius Aelius Stilo Praeconinus, ancient Roman scholar
