= OCL =

The initialism OCL can have several meanings, depending on context:

- OCl^{−}, the hypochlorite ion, in chemistry
- Open Content License
- Object Constraint Language
- IBM Open Class Library
- Operational Control Language of IBM mid-range computers
- Overseas Containers Limited, former shipping company
- OFC Champions League, football tournament
- Overhead contact line, in railway electrification
