= AppJar =

Cross-platform Python library for developing GUIs

- Developer(s): Richard Jarvis
- Initial release: 2015; 10 years ago
- Stable release: 0.94 / May 26, 2019; 5 years ago
- Repository: github.com/jarvisteach/appJar
- Written in: Python
- Operating system: Cross-platform
- License: Apache License v2.0
- Website: appjar.info

appJar is a cross-platform Python library for developing GUIs (graphical user interfaces). It can run on Linux, OS X, and Windows. It was conceived, and continues to be developed with educational use as its focus, so is accompanied by comprehensive documentation, as well as easy-to-follow lessons.

== License ==
appJar is licensed under the Apache License v2.0.

== History ==
appJar was originally envisaged as a simple wrapper around tkinter, to allow secondary school pupils to develop simple graphical user interfaces in Python. It was meant to hide away the complexity, so that pupils could focus on writing algorithms, without having to worry about how to position widgets and link to functions. It was started out in the winter of 2014, as a simple in-house project, but soon started to grow. It was published to GitHub on July 31, 2015, and first added to the PyPi repository on 20 December 2016. In June 2017, appJar was featured in an article in The MagPi, detailing how it could be used to interact with Minecraft.

== Example ==
This is a simple "Hello world" example:

#!/usr/bin/env python3
from appJar import gui

app = gui("Demo")
app.addLabel("l1", "Hello World")
app.go()

The above example is getting even simpler in the 1.0 release (available in beta in the 0.9 release):

#!/usr/bin/env python3
from appJar import gui

with gui("Demo") as app:
    app.label("Hello World")
