= GNU Hello =

Example GNU package

- Developer: GNU Project
- Stable release: 2.12.3 / 17 March 2026; 4 months ago
- Operating system: GNU, Linux
- Type: "Hello, world!"
- License: GPLv3
- Website: Official website
- Repository: cgit.git.savannah.gnu.org/cgit/hello.git

GNU Hello is an almost-trivial free software program that prints the phrase "Hello, world!" or a translation thereof to the screen. It can print the message in different formats, or print a custom message. The primary purpose of the program is to serve as an example of the GNU coding standards, demonstrate how to write programs that perform different tasks depending on their input, and to serve as a model for GNU maintainer practices. As such, it can be used as a template for new, more serious, software projects.

== See also ==
- "Hello, World!" program
- GNU
