= XBLite =

XBLite Summary
- Paradigm: Procedural
- Designed by: David Szafranski
- Developer: David Szafranski
- First appeared: 2001; 25 years ago
- Stable release: v2.4.3 / February 1, 2025; 20 months ago
- Typing discipline: Static
- Memory management: Auto memory management and garbage collection
- OS: Microsoft Windows
- License: GNU GPL, Standard libraries licensed under the GNU LGPL
- Website: www.xblite.org

Influenced by
- XBasic, QuickBASIC

XBLite is a free open-source BASIC programming language compiler and development system. It was started in 2001 by David Szafranski in order to provide a Windows exclusive version of the XBasic dialect. XBLite is released under the GNU GPL licensing scheme, Standard libraries are released under the GNU LGPL licensing scheme.

The XBLite syntax is very similar to that of XBasic and somewhat similar to Microsoft's QuickBASIC in that it is a procedural language capable of subs and functions. XBLite also has 64 bit integer data type, User Defined Types and the ability to have multiple modules in order to create GUI applications or games.

== XBLite History ==
XBLite is a project that was started back in 2001. The main idea was to create a language that was based on the XBasic project that was to be exclusively a Microsoft Windows only programming language and environment. The first official release (version 1.0.0) was announced in October 2002, and subsequent versions were spread out amongst the last 6 years of development. Each release boasted both bug fixes and new features (to either the language itself and/or the different tools that are available with the XBLite project).

Today, version 2.4.0 is the current release of the compiler and version 1.30 of XSEd (The code editor). One of the latest projects is a visual GUI designer called viXen.

== XBLite Development Specific Events ==
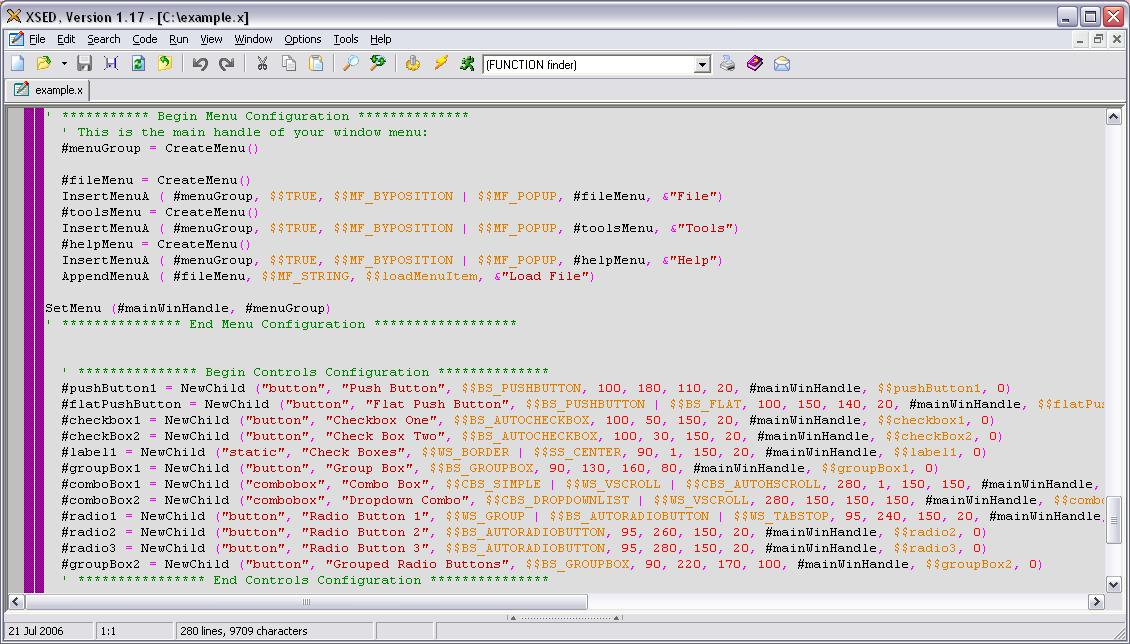
Screenshot of the XSEd editor, used with the XBLite programming language.

- A project called xpeeper is currently being developed by the XBLite team. This aims to give Peephole optimization technology to the XBLite project. The project has been distributed with XBLite since XBLite version 2.3.0. As well, XBLite is itself written in XBLite, making it a self hosting compiler (it can compile itself). Since version 2.1.0, XBLite incorporates the M4 preprocessor tool.
- XSEd, the code editor available with XBLite was developed in XBLite. It is based on the Scintilla project, a widely used editing component. XSEd is a full featured editor that allows users to work with XBLite source code modules and allows them to compile the code right from the editor.
- Open-source project, viXen was originally created by John "prujohn" Evans, who released version 0.50a on July 22, 2006. It is a WYSIWYG screen designer and an XBLite generator: viXen allows users to prototype a Windows GUI application before coding in XBLite the actual functions inside the generated skeleton. Currently, Guy Lonné develops and maintains the viXen project at SourceForge.
- XBLite working with the native Windows API, Callum Lowcay started the WinX project. It is a GUI library (WinX.dll) written in XBLite that "wraps" many of the most useful WinAPI calls. WinX simplifies coding Windows GUI applications in XBLite by providing an interface to the Windows widgets. WinX's applications can be first prototyped using viXen by just selecting the generation switch "Use WinX" prior the generation of the source code.

== Components ==
XBLite comes with a complete set of components.

- Compiler (can make executable files, libraries and dynamic linked libraries (DLL) files)
- Scintilla Code Editor XSEd
- Resource Compiler
- Peephole optimizer xpeeper
- Graphical user interface builder viXen (Beta stage but very usable)
- GUI library WinX

== Sample Code ==
Here is a classic example as it might be coded in XBLite.

- Hello world program in XBLite, console mode
   PROGRAM "hello"
 CONSOLE
 DECLARE FUNCTION Entry ()
 FUNCTION Entry ()
   a$ = INLINE$ ("Hello World!\n\n\n Press Enter to quit ")
 END FUNCTION
 END PROGRAM
- Hello world program in XBLite, Windows GUI mode
   PROGRAM "sayhello"
 ' interfaces to system DLLs
 IMPORT "gdi32"             ' importing interface to gdi32.dll
 IMPORT "user32"            ' importing interface to user32.dll
 DECLARE FUNCTION Entry ()  ' declare function Entry()

 FUNCTION Entry ()          ' define (instantiate) function Entry()
  ' display a message box and wait until the user clicks the 'OK!' button
  MessageBoxA (0, &"Hello world!", &"Windows GUI Version", $$MB_OK)
 END FUNCTION
 END PROGRAM
