= Easy Programming Language =

Chinese programming language

- Paradigm: Multi-paradigm: compiled, imperative, procedural, object-oriented, functional
- Designed by: The Easy Programming Language Company
- First appeared: 2004
- Stable release: 5.95 / September 4, 2023; 2 years ago
- OS: Cross-platform
- License: Proprietary software
- Filename extensions: .e, .ec
- Website: epl.eyuyan.com

Major implementations
- E Programming Language

Dialects
- EF

Easy Programming Language (EPL, Chinese: 易语言) is a visual compiled multilingual proprietary programming language. EPL is somewhat popular in China because it features a full Chinese environment. The language has traditional Chinese, simplified Chinese, English and Japanese variants. The language has been shown to improve coding productivity for programmers who are not as fluent in English, albeit with less runtime efficiency.

In addition, it is cross-platform, as it currently supports both Microsoft Windows and Linux. It is object-oriented and structured.

== Features ==
The program defines modules in a tabular format.

Easy modules (Chinese: 易模块) are pre-compiled modules with the ".ec" extension name.

== Programming examples ==
Below is a "Hello, World!" program, in simplified Chinese:

调试输出("Hello, world!")
