= KuMir =

Educational programming language and environment

KuMir (Russian: КуМи́р; an acronym for Комплект Учебных МИРов, "Set of Educational Worlds", or Миры Кушниренко, "Kushnirenko's Worlds") is a programming language and programming system designed to support introductory courses in computer science and programming in secondary and higher education.

== History ==
In 1995, KuMir was recommended by the Ministry of Education of the Russian Federation as the main teaching material for the course "Fundamentals of Computer Science and Computer Engineering", based on the textbook by Anatoly Kushnirenko, Gennady V. Lebedev, and Rudolf Svoren.

A new version of KuMir was subsequently developed and is being maintained. It uses the Qt library and runs on the Linux and Windows operating systems. The specifications for the development of the new version were prepared by A. G. Kushnirenko and A. G. Leonov. Development is carried out by the Pushchino group of employees of the Federal Research Center "Computer Science and Control" of the Russian Academy of Sciences (FRC CSC RAS), under the direction of M. A. Roitberg.

In 2018, the FRC CSC RAS planned the further development and support of the KuMir system.

== Language features ==
KuMir is based on a methodology developed in the second half of the 1980s under the direction of academician A. P. Ershov. This methodology was widely used in secondary schools in the Soviet Union and Russia. The KuMir system uses the school algorithmic language devised by A. P. Ershov, a simple ALGOL-like language with Russian vocabulary and built-in commands for controlling program executors, such as Robot and Draftsman.

== Code examples ==
=== Fibonacci numbers ===
алг
нач
  цел i
  нц для i от 1 до 10
    вывод fibonnaci(i), нс
  кц
кон

алг цел fibonnaci(цел n)
нач
  если n <= 2 то
    знач  := 1
  иначе
    знач  := fibonnaci(n - 1) + fibonnaci(n - 2)
  все 
кон

== License ==
The system was developed at the Federal Research Center "Computer Science and Control" of the Russian Academy of Sciences on commission from the Russian Academy of Sciences and is freely distributed under the terms of the GNU GPL 2.0.
