= El-76 =

Computer language

El-76 (Эль-76)
- Paradigm: applied programming, structured programming, task management, system programming.
- Designed by: Boris Babayan & Co
- Developer: Lebedev Institute of Precision Mechanics and Computer Engineering
- First appeared: January 1, 1972; 53 years ago
- Website: About Эль-76

Major implementations
- Elbrus

Influenced by
- ALMIR-65, Analitik

El-76 (Russian: Эль-76) is a high-level programming language developed in 1972–1973. The language was created for the Elbrus computer. Participants in the creation of the language were: Boris Babayan, V. M. Pentkovskii, S. V. Semenikhin, S. V. Veretennikov, V. Y. Volkonsky, S. M. Zotov, A. I. Ivanov, Y. S. Rumyantsev, V. P. Torchigin, M. I. Kharitonov, and V. S. Shevekov.

Эль-76 was developed at the Lebedev Institute of Precision Mechanics and Computer Engineering of the USSR Academy of Sciences. Its syntax was based on Russian language.

== Program sample ==
The sample below is a program of Hello World kind.

   процедура передатьпривет = проц(ф32 числоприветов)
   начало
     если числоприветов = 0 то
       печатьмс(стр8 "МИР не получил ни одного привета!")
     инес числоприветов = 1 то
       печатьмс(стр8 "В МИР был отправлен всего один привет!")
     иначе
       печатьмс(стр8 "МИРУ передали несколько приветов. А если точно, то их было");
       печать(числоприветов)
     все
   конец;
   
   печатьмс(стр8 "Привет просто так!"); % такой привет мартышка точно не потеряет
   печатькс();                          % разрыв строки
   передатьпривет(100)                  % привет из процедуры
 конец

Output:

Привет просто так!
МИРУ передали несколько приветов. А если точно, то их было 100
