= XBasic =

Variant of the BASIC programming language

- Family: BASIC
- Developers: Max Reason, Eddie Penninkhof
- First appeared: late 1980s
- Stable release: 6.3.26 / 2018; 7 years ago
- Preview release: 6.3.26 / 2018; 7 years ago
- Platform: i386
- OS: Windows, Linux
- License: GNU LGPL
- Filename extensions: x
- Website: xbasic.sourceforge.net

Influenced by
- BASIC, C (programming language)

XBasic is a variant of the BASIC programming language that was developed in the late 1980s for the Motorola 88000 CPU and Unix by Max Reason. In the early 1990s it was ported to Windows and Linux, and since 1999 it has been available as open source software with its runtime library under the LGPL license.

It should not be confused with TI Extended BASIC, which is sometimes called XBasic or X Basic. It should also not be confused with the proprietary Xbasic language used in Alpha Software's Alpha Anywhere and Alpha Five products.

Version 6.2.3 was the last official release, released on 27 October 2002, however unofficial releases are still being maintained by a group of enthusiasts on GitHub.

== Characteristics ==
XBasic has signed and unsigned 8-, 16- and 32-bit and signed 64-bit integers as well as 32- and 64-bit floating point values. The string data type is only for 8-bit characters.

It is possible to generate an assembly language file. XBasic has a Windows only version called XBLite. Development is at SourceForge.

== Components ==
- Editor (writing source code)
- Compiler (creating machine code)
- Debugger (checking for errors)
- Libraries (ready made code to call on)
- GuiDesigner (creates the graphical user interface for the program)

== Example code ==
' Programs contain:
' 1. A PROLOG with type/function/constant declarations.
' 2. This Entry() function where execution begins.
' 3. Zero or more additional functions.
'
FUNCTION Entry()

PRINT "Hello World"

PRINT 2+2
PRINT 44/12
PRINT 33*3

END FUNCTION
