= PSeInt =

Free educational programming software

- Repository: sourceforge.net/p/pseint/code/ci/master/tree/
- Website: pseint.sourceforge.net

PSeInt is a multiplatform educational free software, directed at people who start programming. The version for desktop operating systems interprets pseudocode in Spanish, the Android version interprets pseudocode in English, Spanish and Portuguese.

== Description ==
PSeInt is the abbreviation of PSeudocode Interpreter, an educational tool created in Argentina, used mainly by students to learn the basics of programming and the development of logic. It is a very popular software of its kind and is widely used in universities in Latin America and Spain. It uses pseudocode for the solution of algorithms.

== Purpose of PSeInt ==
PSeInt is designed to assist students who start in the construction of computer algorithms or programs. The pseudocode is usually used as the first contact to introduce basic concepts such as the use of control structures, expressions, variables, etc., without having to deal with the particularities of the syntax of a real language. This software aims to facilitate the beginner the task of writing algorithms in this pseudolanguage by presenting a set of aids and assistance, and also provide some additional tools that help you find errors and understand the logic of the algorithms.

== Characteristics ==
- Autocomplete language
- Emerging aid
- Command Templates
- Supports procedures and functions
- Intelligent Indentation
- Export to other languages (C, C++, C#, Java, PHP, JavaScript, Visual Basic .NET, Python, Matlab)
- Graphing, creation and edition of flow diagrams
- Editor with syntax coloring
- PSeInt official forum
- Multi-platform software on Microsoft Windows, Linux and Mac OS X, in December 2016 started an independent development for Android.

== Award ==
PSeInt was the Project of the Month at SourceForge on two occasions, from September 1, 2015 and from December 19, 2016. and since November 16, 2019. It also has the Open Source Excellence distinction (more than 100,000 total downloads or 10,000 monthly downloads for the first time.)
