= Ezhil (programming language) =

Tamil-based language, for education

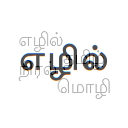
- Paradigm: interpreted, imperative, structured
- Designed by: Muthiah Annamalai at Google scholar
- Developer: Independent/Freelance
- First appeared: 2007
- Stable release: version 0.99 / 23 August 2017; 9 years ago
- Preview release: version 10rc0 / 14 March 2021; 5 years ago
- Typing discipline: strong, dynamic
- OS: Linux, Windows, Can be run in MacOS using Python's pip (package manager)
- License: GPLv3
- Filename extensions: .n
- Website: ezhillang.org

Major implementations
- Ezhil-Lang

Influenced by
- Logo, BASIC, Python

Ezhil, in Tamil language script (Tamil: எழில், romanized: Eḻil, lit. 'beauty', Tamil pronunciation: [eɻil̪]), is a compact, open source, interpreted, programming language, originally designed to enable native-Tamil speaking students, K-12 age-group to learn computer programming, and enable learning numeracy and computing, outside of linguistic expertise in predominately English language-based computer systems.

In the Ezhil programming language, Tamil keywords and language-grammar are chosen to easily enable the native Tamil speaker write programs in the Ezhil system. Ezhil allows easy representation of computer program closer to the Tamil language logical constructs equivalent to the conditional, branch and loop statements in modern English based programming languages. Ezhil is the first freely available programming language in the Tamil language and one of many known non-English-based programming languages. The language was officially announced in July 2009, while it has been developed since late 2007.

== Description ==
The syntax of Ezhil is broadly similar to that of BASIC: blocks of code are run in sequential order, or via functions definitions, in a common control flow structures include while, and if. The termination of function block and statement blocks should have the termination keyword, similar to END in BASIC. Declarations are not necessary as Ezhil is a dynamic typed language, though type conversions must be made explicitly. Ezhil has built-in types for Numbers, Strings, Logicals and Lists.

=== Goals ===
- Educational: Ezhil language is targeted toward K-12 students, and native-Tamil speakers, to learn elementary computer science principle
- Intuitive: Ezhil language syntactic sugar is arranged to allow a sentence structure closer to the head final Tamil language, where the usual word order is SOV, in contrast to the SVO order of English.

=== Features ===
- Arithmetic and logical operations, precedence indicated with parenthesis
- Over 350+ builtins - many of them commonly found in the Python standard library
- Procedural programming using functions, supporting recursion, call-by-value etc.
- Ezhil as a language - it is not a macro-processor, and it is a complete compiler-front-end
- Ezhil language has syntax highlighting support for Notepad++ and Emacs

=== Keywords ===
Conditional Statements are modeled after the IF-ELSEIF-ELSE statement . Loop control statements deriving from the WHILE statements are chosen. The function declaration syntax is kept simple. Details include the print statement, and the flow control statements below.

1.- : PRINT statement - பதிப்பி
2.- : BREAK statement - நிறுத்து 
3.- : CONTINUE statement - தொடர்
4.- : RETURN statement - பின்கொடு 
5.- : IF-ELSEIF-ELSE-statement - ஆனால், இல்லைஆனால், இல்லை
6.- : END-statement -  முடி
7.- : FUNCTION-statement - நிரல்பாகம்
8.- : WHILE-statement - வரை

=== Type system ===
Ezhil has four basic types, for Numbers, Strings, Logicals and Lists. It does not allow creation of new types, being a procedural language without structures or objects.

== Language - control structures, function declarations and operators grammar ==
Standard language grammar for control structures for Ezhil language is given below,

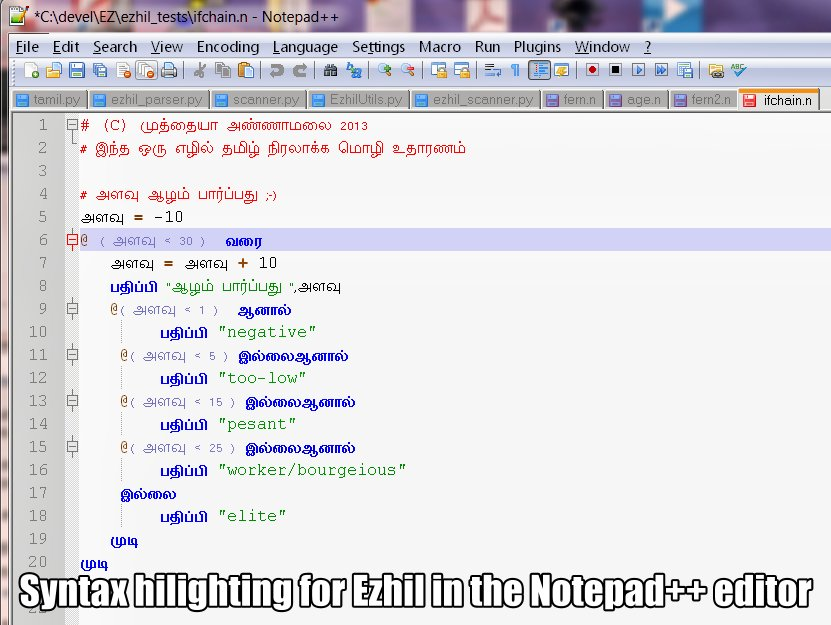
Ezhil programs in Notepad++ syntax highlighting mode

=== If-else statement ===
@( CONDITION ) ஆனால்
   #True branch
இல்லை
   #False branch
முடி

=== Loop statement ===
@( CONDITION ) வரை
    #LOOP BODY
முடி

=== Operators ===
Standard logical operators, equality "==", inequality "!=", arithmetic comparison ">=", "<=",">","<" are supported. Arithmetic operators like "+","-","*","/" indicate standard plus, minus, product, division. Modulo is denoted by "%", and exponent by "^" characters.

=== Comments ===
'#' character denotes a single-line comment from the point to end-of-line. Multi-line comments are not defined.

=== Function declaration ===
நிரல்பாகம் [FUNCTION_NAME] ( ARGLIST )
  [FUNCTION BODY]
முடி

== Variable scoping, and visibility ==
Ezhil supports only call-by-value, and copies all data structures on function invocations. Globals are not supported. Recursion is supported and functions invocation copies variables.

== Implementations ==
Current Ezhil implementation is tightly integrated with the Python runtime. Ezhil interpreter is based on a readline-like CLI, while it can also be run in a batch mode. The interactive mode consumes programs as UTF-8 encoded text and builds a tree, using a compiler front-end, to build an AST, and executes it using the Python objects build from this AST.

== Examples ==
=== Hello world ===
The following is a Hello world program in Ezhil:

# தமிழில் ஒரு எடுத்துக்காட்டு

பதிப்பி "வணக்கம் Vijay!"
பதிப்பி "உலகே வணக்கம்"
பதிப்பி "******* நன்றி!. *******"
exit()

=== Guessing game ===
The following is a guessing game with 10-chances to guess a number between [1-100].

பதிப்பி "வணக்கம், விதி விளையாட்டுக்கு வருக!"

# ஒவ்வொரு முறை ஒரு புதிய விதி தேவை
seed( 1729 + 500*random() )
எண் = randint(1,100)

# 10 வாய்ப்புகளை கொடுக்க
வாய்ப்பு = 0

@( வாய்ப்பு < 10 ) வரை
   பதிப்பி "நான் என் இதயத்தில் எண் [1-100] ஒன்று நினைக்கிறேன்"
   பதிப்பி "நான் என்ன நினைக்கிறேன் என்று தெரியுமா?"
   guess = உள்ளீடு ( "Guess/யூகிக்க >>" )
   வாய்ப்பு = வாய்ப்பு + 1
   #பதிப்பி ( எண் == guess )
   #பதிப்பி எண்
   @( எண் == guess ) ஆனால்
      பதிப்பி "வாழ்த்துக்கள்! சரியான பதில்"
      exit(0)
   முடி

   @( எண் < guess ) ஆனால்
      பதிப்பி "உங்கள் உள்ளீடு அதிகமாக உள்ளது"
   இல்லை
      பதிப்பி "உங்கள் உள்ளீடு குறைத்து உள்ளது"
  முடி

   பதிப்பி "இன்னும் "
   பதிப்பி ( 10 - வாய்ப்பு )
   பதிப்பி "வாய்ப்புக்குள் மீதமுள்ளன முடி"
முடி

பதிப்பி "மன்னிக்கவும் : 10 வாய்ப்பு முடிக்க முடியவில்லை!"
exit( -1 )

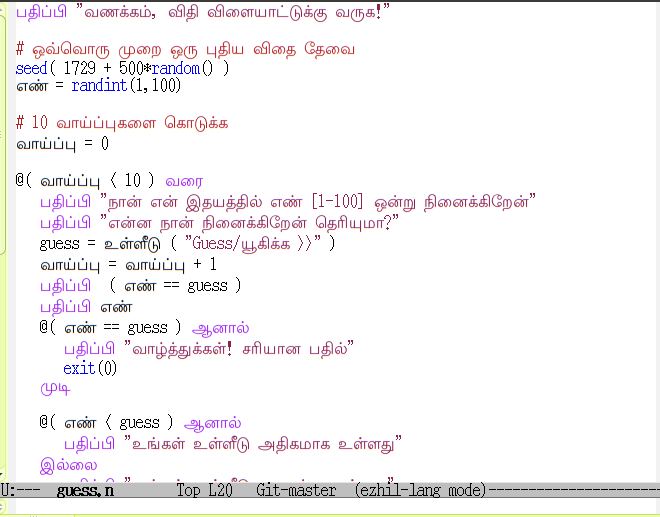
The following is a guessing game with 10-chances to guess a number between [1-100]

=== File I/O ===
# கோப்புப் பயன்பாடு
fp = கோப்பை_திற( "names.txt","w")

# நாம் ஒரு பட்டியலில் இருந்து வார்த்தைகளை பயன்படுத்த முடியும்
எ = ["இந்த","ஒரு","எழில்","தமிழ்","நிரலாக்க","மொழி","உதாரணம்"]
இ = 0
@( இ < len(எ) ) வரை
  # நாம் ஒவ்வொரு வரியும் ஒரு எண் மற்றும் வார்த்தை சேர்க்க முடியும்
  வரி = str(இ) +" = "+ எடு( எ, இ ) + " \n"
  பதிப்பி வரி
  கோப்பை_எழுது( fp,வரி )
  இ = இ + 1
முடி
#சேமித்து மூட
கோப்பை_மூடு( fp )

# மறு திறந்த கோப்பு
fp = கோப்பை_திற( "names.txt")

# மற்றும் உள்ளடக்கங்களை படிக்கவும்
வரிகள் = கோப்பை_படி(fp)

# பயனருக்கு காண்பிக்க
பதிப்பி வரிகள்

# கோப்பு மூட
கோப்பை_மூடு( fp )

# ஒரு எடிட்டர் கோப்பு திறக்க, "names.txt". emacs அல்லது Notepad பயன்படுத்தவும்.

=== Turtle graphics ===
The following is a Turtle graphics based example to draw the Yin-Yang symbols.

நிரல்பாகம் yin(radius, color1, color2)
    #turtle_width(3)
    turtle_color("black")
    turtle_fill(True)
    turtle_circle(radius/2., 180)
    turtle_circle(radius, 180)
    turtle_left(180)
    turtle_circle( -1*radius/2.0 , 180 )
    turtle_color(color1)
    turtle_fill(True)
    turtle_color(color2)
    turtle_left(90)
    turtle_up()
    turtle_forward(radius*0.375)
    turtle_right(90)
    turtle_down()
    turtle_circle(radius*0.125)
    turtle_left(90)
    turtle_fill(False)
    turtle_up()
    turtle_backward(radius*0.375)
    turtle_down()
    turtle_left(90)
முடி

நிரல்பாகம் main()
    #turtle_reset()
    yin(200, "white", "black")
    yin(200, "black", "white")
    turtle_ht()
    pause( "Done! Hit enter to quit", 5)
முடி

main()

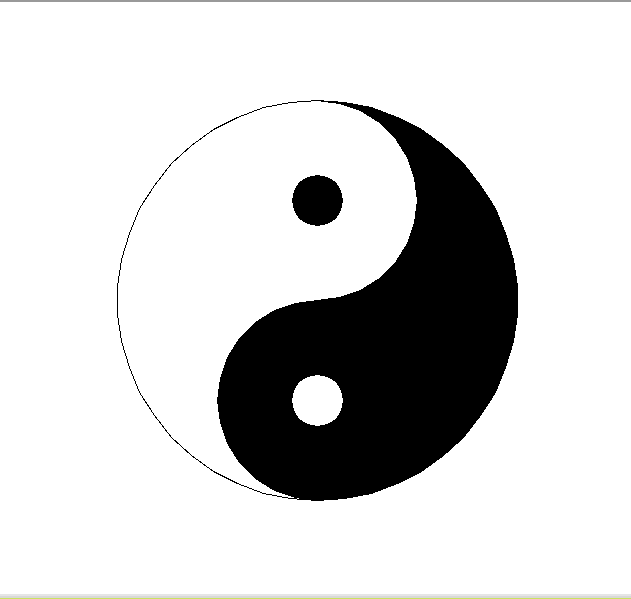
The following is a Turtle graphics based example to draw the Yin-Yang symbols

== Logo Ezhil ==
- Logo for Ezhil language consists of interlaced letters of the Tamil language script, spelling out Ezhil - A Tamil programming language.

== See also ==
- Comparison of programming languages
