= Fjölnir (programming language) =

Programming language

- Paradigm: procedural, object-oriented
- Designed by: Snorri Agnarsson
- First appeared: 1980s
- Typing discipline: strong, dynamic
- Scope: lexical
- OS: MS-DOS
- Filename extensions: .fjo, .fjv, .sma, .ein

Fjölnir (also Fjolnir or Fjoelnir) is a programming language developed by professor Snorri Agnarsson of computer science at Háskóli Íslands (University of Iceland) that was mostly used in the 1980s. The source files usually have the extension fjo or sma.

== Features ==
Fjölnir is based on the concept of representing programs as trees, and packages by substitutions on trees using algebraic operators. For example, in the Hello World example below, "GRUNNUR" is a package, the block of code between braces is a package, and * is an operator that substitutes names in one package with elements from another. In this case, skrifastreng (which writes a string to the standard output) is imported from "GRUNNUR".

== Code examples ==
;; Hello world in Fjölnir

"hello" < main
{
    main ->
    stef(;)
    stofn
        skrifastreng(;"Hello, world!"),
    stofnlok
}
*
"GRUNNUR"
;
