= List of Lisp software and tools =

Lisp software and development tools

This is a list of software and programming tools for the Lisp programming language, which includes frameworks, libraries, IDEs, build tools, and related projects.

== Lisp frameworks and libraries ==
See also: Common Lisp libraries

- Alexandria — utility functions for Common Lisp
- CL-HTTP — web server and web framework in Common Lisp
- Common Lisp Interface Manager (CLIM) — GUI toolkit for Common Lisp
- Common Lisp Object System (CLOS) — object-oriented programming system for Lisp
- McCLIM — open-source implementation of CLIM
- serapeum — utilities and extensions to Alexandria
- Slynk — backend server for SLIME
- trivial-garbage — portable garbage-collection finalizers
- trivial-gray-streams — Portability library for Common Lisp gray streams

== Machine learning and AI ==
- CLML — Common Lisp Machine Learning library
- Neural Lisp — experimental neural network toolkit in Lisp
- Opencog — cognitive architecture with Lisp components
- Owl Lisp — functional Lisp with emphasis on numerical programming

== Math and scientific computing ==
- ACL2 — theorem prover and logic system built on Common Lisp
- Axiom — computer algebra system written in Common Lisp
- Franz Lisp extensions — scientific computing libraries
- Maxima — computer algebra system originally developed in Lisp
- Prototype Verification System (PVS) - mechanized environment for formal specification and verification written in Common Lisp

== Integrated development environments ==
- Allegro Common Lisp — IDE and development environment from Franz Inc.
- ABCL IDE — Lisp development within the JVM ecosystem
- LispWorks — commercial IDE and compiler for Common Lisp
- Portacle — portable Common Lisp development environment
- SLIME — Emacs mode for Common Lisp
- Sly — fork of SLIME with enhanced features

== Text editors with Lisp support ==
- Atom — via Lisp packages and a fork of Atom called Pulsar
- CL-REPL – beginner-friendly REPL for Common Lisp
- Eclipse Dandelion – plugin for Eclipse that supports Lisp programming in the Eclipse platform
- GNU Emacs — with SLIME or Sly
- Lem – general-purpose editor extensible in Common Lisp
- Sublime Text — plugins for Lisp syntax and REPL
- Vim — via Slimv plugin
- VS Code — via Common Lisp and Clojure extensions
- XEmacs – graphical- and console-based text editor

== Build tools and package managers ==
- Another System Definition Facility (ASDF) — build system for Common Lisp
- Quicklisp — library and package manager
- Roswell — environment manager and scripting tool

== Compilers and runtimes ==
- Allegro Common Lisp — commercial implementation
- Armed Bear Common Lisp (ABCL) — runs on the Java Virtual Machine
- Chicken Scheme — Scheme implementation with C backend
- Chez Scheme — optimizing compiler for Scheme
- Clojure — modern Lisp dialect for the JVM
- CLISP — portable ANSI Common Lisp implementation
- CMU Common Lisp (CMUCL) — optimizing compiler for Common Lisp
- ECL — Embeddable Common Lisp
- GNU CLISP — GNU Project’s Lisp implementation
- GNU Guile — Scheme-based extension language of the GNU Project
- LispWorks — commercial Common Lisp environment
- MIT Scheme — Scheme interpreter and compiler
- Racket — descendant of Scheme
- SBCL — Steel Bank Common Lisp, high-performance Common Lisp compiler.

== Debugging and profiling tools ==
- Allegro CL debugger
- LispWorks debugger
- SBCL profiler
- SLIME inspector — runtime debugging

== Testing and quality assurance ==
- FiveAM — unit testing framework for Common Lisp
- Lisp-unit — xUnit-style test framework
- Parachute — unit testing framework
- Prove — testing framework

== List of Lisp-family programming languages ==
- ACL2
- Arc
- AutoLISP
- BBN LISP
- Chez Scheme
- Chialisp
- Chicken
- Clojure
- ANSI Common Lisp
- Common Lisp
- Dylan
- Emacs Lisp
- EuLisp
- Franz Lisp
- GOAL
- Hy
- Ikarus
- Interlisp
- ISLISP
- Le Lisp
- Lisp Flavored Erlang
- Lisp Machine Lisp
- Lispkit Lisp
- Maclisp
- MultiLisp
- NIL
- OpenLisp
- Owl Lisp
- PicoLisp
- Portable Standard Lisp
- Racket
- Scheme
- Scheme In One Defun (SIOD)
- SKILL
- T
- TXR

== Music ==
- OpenMusic — visual programming environment for music composition
- Nyquist — sound synthesis and music composition language in Lisp

== See also ==
- List of Common Lisp implementations
- Lists of programming software development tools by language
