= Gauche (Scheme implementation) =

- Developer: Shiro Kawai
- Initial release: 11 January 2001; 24 years ago
- Stable release: 0.9.15 / 24 April 2024; 19 months ago
- Repository: github.com/shirok/Gauche.git
- Operating system: Cross-platform
- Type: Programming language
- License: BSD License
- Website: practical-scheme.net/gauche/

Gauche is an R7RS Scheme implementation. It is designed for scripting in a production environment. It is intended to allow programmers and system administrators to write scripts in support of daily operations. Quick startup, built-in system interface, native multilingual support are some of its key design goals.

Gauche is free software under the BSD License. It is primarily developed by Shiro Kawai.

== Features ==
- Quick startup - Gauche includes common features in its executable, while less common functions are in libraries which are loaded on demand.
- Module system - A simple module system, API compatible to STklos.
- Object system - CLOS-like object system with metaobject protocol. Almost API compatible to STklos. It is also similar to Guile's object system.
- Native multilingual support - Strings are represented by multibyte string internally. You can use UTF-8, EUC-JP, Shift-JIS or no multibyte encoding. Conversion between native coding system and external coding system is supported by port objects.
- Multibyte regexp - Regular expression matcher is aware of multibyte string; you can use multibyte characters both in patterns and matched strings.
- Built-in system interface - Gauche has built-in support for most POSIX.1 system calls.
- Network interface - Has API for socket-based network interface, including IPv6 if the OS supports it.
- Multithreading - Multithreading is supported on top of pthreads. Scheme-level API conforms to SRFI-18.
- DBM interface - Interfaces to dbm, ndbm and/or gdbm.
- XML parsing - Oleg Kiselyov's SXML tools are included.
