= STklos =

- Developer: Erick Gallesio
- Initial release: January 17, 2001; 25 years ago (version 0.50, first public release)
- Stable release: 26.0 / February 10, 2026; 3 months ago
- Operating system: Cross-platform
- Standard: R^{7}RS (mostly)
- Type: Programming language
- License: GPL
- Website: www.stklos.net
- Repository: github.com/egallesio/STklos

STklos is a Scheme implementation that succeeded STk. It is a bytecode compiler with an ad hoc virtual machine which aims to be fast as well as light.

STklos is free software, released under the GNU General Public License.

In addition to implementing most of R^{5}RS, and a large part of R^{7}RS, STklos supports:

- an object system based on CLOS with multiple inheritance, generic functions, multimethods and a MOP
- a module system
- easy connection with the GTK toolkit
- a low-level macro system that compiles macro expanders into bytecode (syntax-rules is also present as a high-level macro system)
- a full Numerical tower implementation, as defined in R^{7}RS
- Unicode support
- Perl compatible regular expressions via PCRE library
- a simple foreign function interface via libffi
- being compiled as a library and embedded in an application
- native threads, using the libpthread library. The API conforms to SRFI-18
- a number of SRFIs
- easy access to SLIB
- an HTTP client
