= Department of Computer Science (University of British Columbia) =

Department of the University of British Columbia

Coordinates: 49.2612°N 123.2488°W

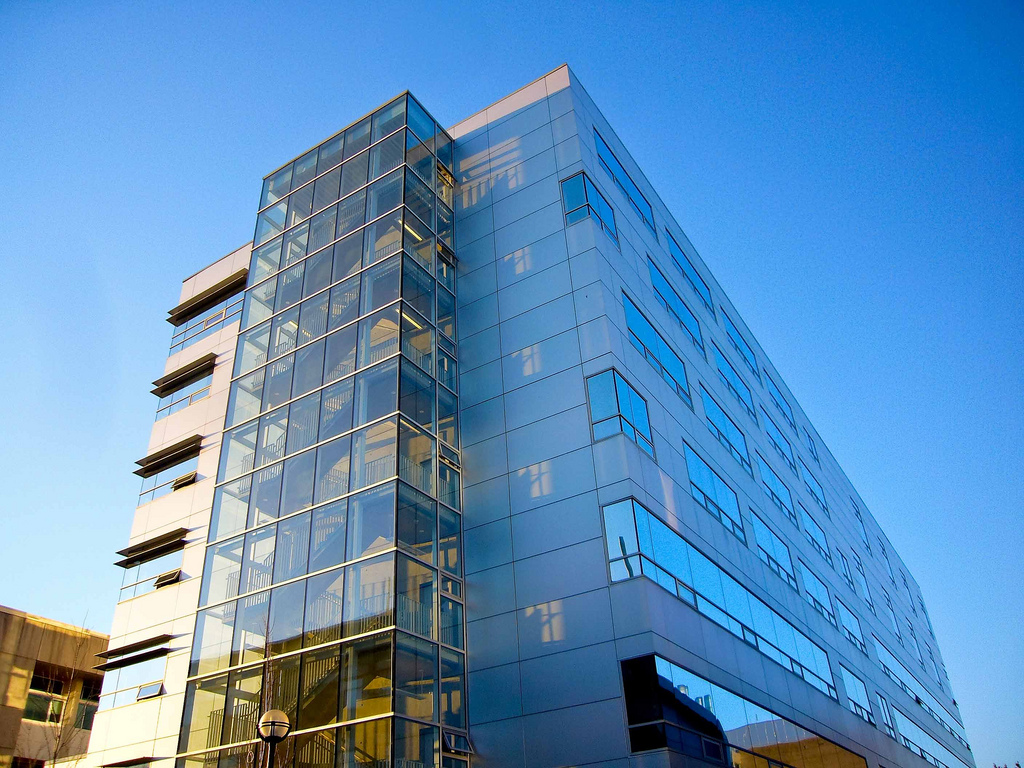
Institute for Computing, Information and Cognitive Systems / Computer Science (ICICS/CS) building at UBC

The Department of Computer Science at the University of British Columbia was established in May 1968. UBC CS is located at the UBC Point Grey campus in Vancouver, British Columbia, Canada. As of November 2023, it has 66 faculty, 64 staff, 259 graduate students, and 2,774 undergraduates.

== History ==
The Computer Science department was established in May 1968 by six founding UBC faculty members:

1. After more than a decade working with Atomic Energy of Canada, Dr. Kennedy joined the department in January 1966 as Director of the Computing Centre, a position he held until June 1980. The Computing Centre served computing needs across the university, including Computer Science. In addition, he became a professor in the Department of Computer Science in 1968.
2. Hugh Dempster was one of the founding members of the Department of Computer Science in 1968. Prior to that, Hugh had worked at UBC in the Computing Centre.
3. Edward Argyle, another founding member, had worked at the Dominion Radio Astrophysical Lab in Penticton and published widely on computer science and astrophysics.
4. Founding member, Wilfred J. Hansen wrote one of the founding texts on data structures, "Data Structures" and "Data Structures in Pascal".
5. John L. Allard was a founding faculty member.
6. John J.E.L. Peck was the first Department Head and remained so until 1977.

== Research activities ==
The department's research activities are organized around a number of collaborative research groups:

- AI (Artificial Intelligence)
- Algorithms Lab
- AMLTN: Advanced Machine Learning Training Network
- CAIDA (Centre for Artificial Intelligence Decision-Making & Action)
- CVL: Computer Vision Lab
- Data Science Institute
- DFP (Designing for People Cluster)
- DMM (Data Management and Mining Lab)
- DSI (Data Science Institute)
- eDAPT: Designing Interactive Technologies
- HAI: Human-AI Interaction
- Imager: Laboratory for Graphics, Visualization and HCI
- InfoVis (Information Visualization Group)
- ISD (Integrated System Design ISD)
- MILD (Mathematics of Information, Learning and Data
- ML (Machine Learning)
- NLP (Natural Language Processing)
- PLAI (Programming Languages for Artificial Intelligence)
- SCL (Scientific Computing Laboratory)
- Security and Privacy Group
- SPIN (Sensory Perception & Interaction Research Group)
- SPL (Software Practices Lab)
- SSL (Sensorimotor Systems Lab)
- Systopia (Systems research)

== Ratings ==
The department is rated by Maclean's 2024 annual rankings as tied for the best computer science university program in Canada.

The department is ranked 26th in the world by the QS World University Subject Rankings.

UBC is ranked as the 34th best university in the world by QS World University Rankings.

== Notable faculty ==
- Cristina Conati – Multiple papers and awards, previous President of AAAC (Association for the Advancement of Affective Computing)
- Anne Condon – bioinformatics and computational complexity, former department chair.
- Gregor Kiczales – His best known work is on Aspect-oriented programming and the AspectJ extension for Java at Xerox PARC. He contributed to the design of the Common Lisp Object System and is the author of the book The Art of the Metaobject Protocol, along with Jim Des Rivieres and Daniel G. Bobrow
- Kevin Leyton-Brown – Canada CIFAR AI Chair and Director of the UBC ICICS Centre for Artificial Intelligence Decision-Making and Action (CAIDA)
- Alan Mackworth (Professor Emeretus) – Founding director of the UBC Laboratory for Computational Intelligence. He is the Past President of the Association for the Advancement of Artificial Intelligence (AAAI).
- Joanna McGrenere – An expert in Human-Computer Interaction, and founder of the Designing for People initiative at UBC
- Tamara Munzner – Expert in information visualization and author of several books on the subject matter
- Gail Murphy – Vice President of Research & Innovation (UBC), co-founder and Director at Tasktop Technologies Incorporated (now Planview)
- Margo Seltzer – Canada 150 Research Chair in Computer Systems and the Cheriton Family Chair in Computer Science. Former president of USENIX.

== See also ==
- Bioinformatics, and Empirical & Theoretical Algorithmics Lab
- Canadian Institute for Advanced Research
- Natural Sciences and Engineering Research Council (NSERC)
- Peter Wall Institute for Advanced Studies
- Sauder School of Business
