= Object Lisp =

Object Lisp was a computer programming language, a dialect of the Lisp language. It was an object-oriented extension for the Lisp dialect Lisp Machine Lisp, designed by Lisp Machines, Inc. Object Lisp was also an early example of prototype-based programming.

It was seen as a competitor to other object-oriented extensions to Lisp at around the same time such as Flavors, in use by Symbolics, Common Objects developed by Hewlett-Packard, and CommonLoops, in use by Xerox.

Object Lisp was also used in early versions of Macintosh Common Lisp. There, the user interface toolkit was written using Object Lisp.
