= S-1 Lisp =

S-1 Lisp was a Lisp implementation written in Lisp for the 36-bit pipelined S-1 Mark IIA supercomputer computer architecture, which has 32 megawords of RAM.
