= CommonLoops =

CommonLoops (the Common Lisp Object-Oriented Programming System; an acronym reminiscent of the earlier Lisp OO system "Loops" for the Interlisp-D system) is an early programming language which extended Common Lisp to include Object-oriented programming functionality and is a dynamic object system which differs from the OOP facilities found in static languages such as C++ or Java. Like New Flavors, CommonLoops supported multiple inheritance, generic functions and method combination. CommonLoops also supported multi-methods and made use of metaobjects. CommonLoops and New Flavors were the primary ancestors of CLOS. CommonLoops was supported by a portable implementation known as Portable CommonLoops (PCL) which ran on all Common Lisp implementations of the day.
