= EuLisp =

Programming language

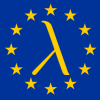
- Paradigm: Multi-paradigm: functional, procedural, meta, object-oriented
- Family: Lisp
- First appeared: 1990; 36 years ago
- Preview release: 0.991 / 2010; 16 years ago
- Typing discipline: Strong, dynamic
- Scope: Static and dynamic
- OS: Linux
- Filename extensions: .em

Major implementations
- EuXLisp, Youtoo, Eu2C

Influenced by
- Common Lisp, InterLisp, LeLisp, Lisp/VM, Scheme, T, CLOS, ObjVlisp, Oaklisp, MicroCeyx, MCS, Standard ML, Haskell

Influenced
- Dylan, ISLISP, Evelin

EuLisp is a statically and dynamically scoped Lisp dialect developed by a loose formation of industrial and academic Lisp users and developers from around Europe. The standardizers intended to create a new Lisp "less encumbered by the past" (compared to Common Lisp), and not so minimalist as Scheme. Another objective was to integrate the object-oriented programming paradigm well. It is a third-generation programming language.

== Origin ==
The language definition process first began in a meeting in 1985 in Paris and took several years. The complete specification and a first implementation (interpreted-only) were made available in 1990.

Timeline of Lisp dialects
1958	1960	1965	1970	1975	1980	1985	1990	1995	2000	2005	2010	2015	2020
LISP 1, 1.5, LISP 2^{(abandoned)}
		Maclisp
			Interlisp
			MDL
				Lisp Machine Lisp
				Scheme				R5RS		R6RS	R7RS small
				NIL
					ZIL (Zork Implementation Language)
					Franz Lisp
					muLisp
					Common Lisp		ANSI standard
					Le Lisp
					MIT Scheme
					XLISP
						T
						Chez Scheme
						Emacs Lisp
						AutoLISP
						PicoLisp
						Gambit
							EuLisp
							ISLISP
							OpenLisp
							PLT Scheme				Racket
							newLISP
							GNU Guile
									Visual LISP
										Clojure
										Arc
										LFE
											Hy

== Distinguishing features ==
Its main traits are that it is a Lisp-1 (no separate function and variable namespaces), has a Common Lisp Object System (CLOS) style generic-function type object-oriented system named The EuLisp Object System (TELOS) integrated from the ground up, has a built-in module system, and is defined in layers to promote the use of the Lisp on small, embedded hardware and educational machines. It supports continuations, though not as powerfully as Scheme. It has a simple lightweight process mechanism (threads).

=== Summary ===
- A definition in levels, currently Level-0 and Level-1
- Modules based on (non-first-class) lexical environments.
- Lexically scoped, with dynamic or late binding available in Level-1.
- A single name space for function and variable names (like Scheme).
- Lightweight processes.
- A fully integrated object system with single inheritance at Level-0 and multiple inheritance and meta-object protocol at Level-1.
- An object-oriented condition system.

== Implementations ==
An early implementation of EuLisp was Free and Eventually Eulisp (FEEL). The successor to FEEL was Youtoo (interpreted and compiled versions), by University of Bath in the United Kingdom. An interpreter for the basic level of EuLisp, level-0, was written by Russell Bradford in XScheme, an implementation of Scheme by David Michael Betz, originally named EuScheme EuScheme but the most recent version is renamed EuXLisp to avoid confusion. Also Eu2C , a EuLisp optimizing compiler, was created by Fraunhofer ISST under the APPLY project in Germany .

A dialect of EuLisp was developed, named Plural EuLisp. It was EuLisp with parallel computing programming extensions.

== Example ==
Example use of classes in the algorithm to solve the "Towers of Hanoi" problem.

(defmodule hanoi
  (syntax (syntax-0)
   import (level-0)
   export (hanoi))

;;;-------------------------------------------------
;;; Tower definition
;;;-------------------------------------------------
(defconstant *max-tower-height* 10)

(defclass <tower> ()
  ((id reader: tower-id keyword: id:)
   (blocks accessor: tower-blocks)))

(defun build-tower (x n)
  (labels ((loop (i res)
                 (if (= i 0) res
                   (loop (- i 1) (cons i res)))))
          ((setter tower-blocks) x (loop n ()))
          x))

(defmethod generic-print ((x <tower>) (s <stream>))
  (sformat s "#<tower ~a: ~a>" (tower-id x) (tower-blocks x)))

;;;-------------------------------------------------
;;; Access to tower blocks
;;;-------------------------------------------------
(defgeneric push (x y))

(defmethod push ((x <tower>) (y <fpi>))
  (let ((blocks (tower-blocks x)))
    (if (or (null? blocks) (< y (car blocks)))
        ((setter tower-blocks) x (cons y blocks))
      (error <condition>
             (fmt "cannot push block of size ~a on tower ~a" y x)))))

(defgeneric pop (x))

(defmethod pop ((x <tower>))
  (let ((blocks (tower-blocks x)))
    (if blocks
        (progn
          ((setter tower-blocks) x (cdr blocks))
          (car blocks))
      (error <condition>
             (fmt "cannot pop block from empty tower ~a" x)))))

;;;-------------------------------------------------
;;; Move n blocks from tower x1 to tower x2 using x3 as buffer
;;;-------------------------------------------------
(defgeneric move (n x1 x2 x3))

(defmethod move ((n <fpi>) (x1 <tower>) (x2 <tower>) (x3 <tower>))
  (if (= n 1)
      (progn
        (push x2 (pop x1))
        (print x1 nl x2 nl x3 nl nl))
    (progn
      (move (- n 1) x1 x3 x2)
      (move 1 x1 x2 x3)
      (move (- n 1) x3 x2 x1))))

;;;-------------------------------------------------
;;; Initialize and run the 'Towers of Hanoi'
;;;-------------------------------------------------
(defun hanoi ()
  (let ((x1 (make <tower> id: 0))
        (x2 (make <tower> id: 1))
        (x3 (make <tower> id: 2)))
    (build-tower x1 *max-tower-height*)
    (build-tower x2 0)
    (build-tower x3 0)
    (print x1 nl x2 nl x3 nl nl)
    (move *max-tower-height* x1 x2 x3)))

(hanoi)

;;;-------------------------------------------------
)  ;; End of module hanoi
;;;-------------------------------------------------
