= Bioinformatics, and Empirical & Theoretical Algorithmics Lab =

Canadian research laboratory

Coordinates: 49.2612°N 123.2488°W

The Bioinformatics, and Empirical and Theoretical Algorithmics Laboratory (BETA Lab or short β) is a research laboratory within the UBC Department of Computer Science. Founded in 2000 by Anne Condon, Will Evans, Holger H. Hoos, David G. Kirkpatrick and Nick Pippenger, the BETA Lab is the focus of research in bioinformatics, empirical algorithmics and theoretical computer science at the department.

The BETA Lab is home to faculty members, graduate students and summer interns. Since the inception of the BETA Lab, its members have solved problems in computer science and bioinformatics, including Boolean satisfiability (SAT), time-tabling, winner determination in combinatorial auctions, protein structure prediction in lattice models, as well as prediction and design of RNA secondary structures.

Within the UBC Department of Computer Science, the BETA Lab maintains close ties with the Laboratory for Computational Intelligence and Robotics (LCI) and other research groups.
