= OJ (programming tool) =

- Developer(s): Michiaki Tatsubori, Teruo Koyanagi, Shigeru Chiba
- Stable release: 1.1 20050405 / April 5, 2005
- Written in: Java
- Operating system: Cross-platform
- Platform: Java Virtual Machine
- Type: extensible Java programming language compiler
- License: BSD
- Website: http://www.csg.ci.i.u-tokyo.ac.jp/openjava/

OJ, formerly named OpenJava, is a programming tool that parses and analyzes Java source code. It uses a metaobject protocol (MOP) to provide services for language extensions. Michiaki Tatsubori was the lead developer of OpenJava. Its first release was back to 1997, and won the Student Encouragement Prize at the Java Conference Grandprix '97 held in Japan.

This isn't to be confused with OpenJDK, which is the open source release of the Java compiler runtime and tools.

OpenJava was renamed OJ in October 2007 at the request of Sun Microsystems.
