= Oaklisp =

Portable object-oriented Scheme

- Paradigm: multi-paradigm: object-oriented, functional, procedural
- Designed by: Kevin J. Lang & Barak A. Pearlmutter
- First appeared: 1986
- Stable release: 07-Jan-2000 / January 7, 2000
- Typing discipline: dynamic, strong

Major implementations
- Oaklisp

Influenced by
- Scheme, T, Smalltalk

Influenced
- EuLisp Java, Dylan

Oaklisp is a message based portable object-oriented Scheme developed by Kevin J. Lang and Barak A. Pearlmutter while Computer Science PhD students at Carnegie Mellon University. Oaklisp uses a superset of Scheme syntax. It is based on generic operations rather than functions, and features anonymous classes, multiple inheritance, a strong error system, setters and locators for operations, and a facility for dynamic binding.

Version 1.2 includes an interface, bytecode compiler, run-time system and documentation.
