= Object-Oriented Programming in Common Lisp =

1988 programming book

- Author: Sonya Keene
- Language: English
- Genre: Non-fiction
- Publisher: Addison-Wesley
- Publication date: 1988
- ISBN: 0-201-17589-4

Object-Oriented Programming in Common Lisp: A Programmer's Guide to CLOS (1988, Addison-Wesley, ISBN 0-201-17589-4) is a book by Sonya Keene on the Common Lisp Object System. Published first in 1988, the book starts out with the elements of CLOS and develops through the concepts of data abstraction with classes and methods, inheritance, and genericity towards creating an advanced CLOS program using streams I/O.
