= ObjVlisp =

ObjVlisp is a 1984 object-oriented extension of Vlisp–Vincennes LISP, a LISP dialect developed since 1971 at the University of Paris VIII – Vincennes. It is noteworthy as one of the earliest implementations of the concept of metaclasses, and in particular explicit (as opposed to implicit) metaclasses. In the ObjVlisp model, "each entity is an instance of a single class. Classes are instances of other classes, called metaclasses. This model allows for extension of the static part of OOL, i.e. the structural aspects of objects considered as implementation of abstract data types"

ObjVlisp provided a far more flexible metaclass model than that provided by earlier object-oriented languages, especially Smalltalk. In Smalltalk-80, whenever a new class is created, a corresponding metaclass is created automatically; it does not have a name independent of that of the metaclass for which it was created–metaclasses are implicit rather than explicit. By contrast, in ObjVlisp, it is possible to define named metaclasses, and when defining a class one must specify which named metaclass it will instantiate.

The explicit metaclass support in ObjVlisp influenced the provision of the same capability in the Common Lisp Object System.

The ObjVlisp object model was later implemented in Prolog to produce ObjVProlog. Both Python and Converge implement a meta-class system that is equivalent of that of ObjVLisp.
