= Alan Mackworth =

Canadian artificial intelligence researcher (born 1945)

Alan K. Mackworth
- Born: October 18, 1945 (age 80); Cambridge, England
- Citizenship: Canadian
- Education: University of Sussex; Harvard University; University of Toronto
- Scientific career
- Workplaces: University of British Columbia

Alan Mackworth is a professor emeritus in the Department of Computer Science at the University of British Columbia. He is known as "The Founding Father" of RoboCup. He is a former president of the Association for the Advancement of Artificial Intelligence (AAAI) and former Canada Research Chair in Artificial Intelligence from 2001 to 2014.

== Education ==
Mackworth was educated at the University of Toronto (B.A.Sc.), Harvard University (A.M.) and University of Sussex (D.Phil.).

== Research ==
He works on constraint-based artificial intelligence with applications in vision, robotics, situated agents, assistive technology and sustainability. He is known as a pioneer in the areas of constraint satisfaction, robot soccer, hybrid systems and constraint-based agents. He has authored over 100 papers and co-authored two books: Computational Intelligence: A Logical Approach (1998) and Artificial Intelligence: Foundations of Computational Agents (2010).

== RoboCup ==
Mackworth proposed and built the world's first soccer-playing robots, which led to the development of robot soccer as the premier global platform for multi-agent robotic research through the International RoboCup Foundation, where he has been honoured as "The Founding Father". Robot soccer as a challenge problem has great scientific significance. It has now become a standard test environment for cross-testing research ideas: a forum for evolving theories of multi-agent systems. Through regular international RoboCup tournaments many research teams of students and professors compete and cooperate in the development, testing and evolution of new theories and new algorithms.

== Career ==
He served as the founding director of the UBC Laboratory for Computational Intelligence. He was president and trustee of International Joint Conferences on AI (IJCAI) Inc.; he is on the IJCAI executive committee. He has served on many editorial boards and program committees. He was VP and president of the Canadian Society for Computational Studies of Intelligence (CSCSI). He served as president of the Association for the Advancement of Artificial Intelligence (AAAI).

== Awards ==
Mackworth has received the ITAC/NSERC Award for Academic Excellence, the Killam Research Prize, the CSCSI Distinguished Service Award, the AAAI Distinguished Service Award, the Association for Constraint Programming Award for Research Excellence and the Lifetime Achievement Award of the Canadian AI Association (CAIAC). He is a Fellow of AAAI, the Canadian Institute for Advanced Research and the Royal Society of Canada.
