= Anne Condon =

Irish-Canadian computer scientist

- Education: University College Cork; University of Washington
- Awards: ACM Distinguished Dissertation; ACM Fellow; A. Nico Habermann Award
- Scientific career
- Fields: Computer Science
- Workplaces: University of Wisconsin–Madison; University of British Columbia
- Thesis: Computational Models of Games (1987)
- Doctoral advisor: Richard E. Ladner
- Website: www.cs.ubc.ca/~condon/

Anne Elizabeth Condon, FRSC is an Irish-Canadian computer scientist, professor, and former head of the Computer Science Department of the University of British Columbia. Her research focuses on computational complexity theory, DNA computing, and bioinformatics. She has also held the NSERC/General Motors Canada Chair for Women in Science and Engineering (CWSE) from 2004 to 2009, and has worked to improve the success of women in the sciences and engineering.

== Biography ==
Condon did her undergraduate studies at University College Cork, earning a bachelor's degree in 1982. She moved to the University of Washington for her graduate studies, receiving her doctorate in 1987 under the supervision of Richard E. Ladner. She then joined the faculty at the University of Wisconsin–Madison, and remained there until her 1999 move to UBC.

== Personal life ==
Condon is an avid triathlete, finishing 7th in her age-group (F55-59) during Ironman Canada 2019 and finishing 1st in her age group (F60-64) for Ironman Ireland 2022 in an impressive 12:10 hours timeframe. At the Ironman Hawaii 2022 she finished 18th in her age group (F60-64) with a time of 13:39. At the Ironman 70.3 Championship 2022, she finished 8th in her age group with a time of 5:55.

== Awards and honors ==
Condon won an ACM Distinguished Dissertation award (honorable mention) for her thesis research. In 2010, the Association for Computing Machinery named her an ACM Fellow for contributions to complexity theory and leadership in advancing women in computing. In the same year, she also won the A. Nico Habermann Award of the Computing Research Association for "long-standing and impactful service toward the goal of increasing the participation of women in computer science research." She is also a winner of the University College Cork Distinguished Alumna Award, the University of Washington CSE Alumni Achievement Award., and the 2012 University of Washington College of Engineering Diamond Award for Distinguished Achievement in Academia. She was the 2014 winner of the Grace Hopper Celebration of Women in Computing Technical Leadership ABIE Award

Condon was elected a fellow of the Royal Society of Canada in 2012.

== Publications ==
- M. Andronescu, A. Condon, D.H. Turner, and D.H. Mathews. The Determination of RNA folding nearest neighbor parameters, Methods in Molecular Biology, 1097:45-70, 2014.
- B. Rastegari, A. Condon, N. Immorlica, R. Irving, and K. Leyton-Brown. Reasoning about optimal stable matchings under partial information, The Fifteenth ACM Conference on Electronic Commerce (EC), 431–448, 2014.
- H. Jabbari and A. Condon. A fast and robust iterative algorithm for prediction of RNA pseudoknotted secondary structures BMC Bioinformatics, 15:147, 2014.
- A. Condon, J. Manuch and C. Thachuk, The complexity of string partitioning, Journal of Discrete Algorithms, 32:24-43, 2015. Preliminary version appeared in the 23rd Annual Symposium on Combinatorial Pattern Matching, Springer-Verlag Lecture Notes in Computer Science 7354:159-172, 2012.
- A. Condon and R. M. Karp, "Algorithms for Graph Partitioning on the Planted Bisection Model", J. Random Structures and Algorithms, 18, 116–140, 2001.
- Q. Liu, A. G. Frutos, L. Wang, A. Condon, R. M. Corn, and L. M. Smith, "DNA Computations on Surfaces", Nature, Vol. 403 pages 175–179, 2000.
- O. Madani, A. Condon, and S. Hanks, "On the Undecidability of Probabilistic Planning and Infinite-Horizon Partially Observable Markov Decision Process Problems", Sixteenth National Conference on Artificial Intelligence (AAAI'99), July 1999.
- A. Condon, L. Hellerstein, S. Pottle, and A. Wigderson, "Finite State Automata with Nondeterministic and Probabilistic States", SIAM Journal on Computing, Vol. 27, No. 3, pages 739–762, June 1998.
