= Generic function =

In computer programming, a generic function is a function defined for polymorphism.

== In statically typed languages ==
In statically typed languages (such as C++ and Java), the term generic functions refers to a mechanism for compile-time polymorphism (static dispatch), specifically parametric polymorphism. These are functions defined with TypeParameters, intended to be resolved with compile time type information. The compiler uses these types to instantiate suitable versions, resolving any function overloading appropriately.

== In Common Lisp Object System ==
In some systems for object-oriented programming such as the Common Lisp Object System (CLOS) and Dylan, a generic function is an entity made up of all methods having the same name. Typically a generic function is an instance of a class that inherits both from function and standard-object. Thus generic functions are both functions (that can be called with and applied to arguments) and ordinary objects. The book The Art of the Metaobject Protocol explains the implementation and use of CLOS generic functions in detail.

One of the early object-oriented programming extensions to Lisp is Flavors. It used the usual message sending paradigm influenced by Smalltalk. The Flavors syntax to send a message is:

 (send object :message)

With New Flavors, it was decided the message should be a real function and the usual function calling syntax should be used:

 (message object)

message now is a generic function, an object and function in its own right. Individual implementations of the message are called methods.

The same idea was implemented in CommonLoops. New Flavors and CommonLoops were the main influence for the Common Lisp Object System.

== Example ==
=== Common Lisp ===
Define a generic function with two parameters object-1 and object-2. The name of the generic function is collide.

 (defgeneric collide (object-1 object-2))

Methods belonging to the generic function are defined outside of classes. Here we define a method for the generic function collide which is specialized for the classes asteroid (first parameter object-1) and spaceship (second parameter object-2). The parameters are used as normal variables inside the method body. There is no special namespace that has access to class slots.

 (defmethod collide ((object-1 asteroid) (object-2 spaceship))
   (format t "asteroid ~a collides with spaceship ~a" object-1 object-2))

Calling the generic function:

? (collide (make-instance 'asteroid) (make-instance 'spaceship))
asteroid #<ASTEROID 4020003FD3> collides with spaceship #<SPACESHIP 40200048CB>

Common Lisp can also retrieve individual methods from the generic function. FIND-METHOD finds the method from the generic function collide specialized for the classes asteroid and spaceship.

? (find-method #'collide nil (list (find-class 'asteroid) (find-class 'spaceship)))
#<STANDARD-METHOD COLLIDE NIL (ASTEROID SPACESHIP) 4150015E43>

=== Comparison to other languages ===
Generic functions correspond roughly to what Smalltalk terms methods, with the notable exception that, in Smalltalk, the receiver's class is the sole determinant of which body of code is called: the types or values of the arguments are irrelevant (single dispatch). In a programming language with multiple dispatch when a generic function is called, method dispatch occurs on the basis of all arguments, not just one which is privileged. New Flavors also provided generic functions, but only single dispatch.

In JavaScript, a generic function is a function that can work with values of different types, rather than a specific type. This is achieved through the use of type parameters or by dynamically checking the type of the value being operated on. One common use case for generic functions in JavaScript is to create reusable functions that can work with different data types, such as arrays, strings, or objects. JavaScript's dynamic typing system makes it particularly suited for the creation of generic functions, as values can be easily coerced or converted to different types as needed.
