= Flavors (programming language) =

Programming language

Flavors is an early object-oriented extension to Lisp developed by Howard Cannon at the MIT Artificial Intelligence Laboratory for the Lisp machine and its programming language Lisp Machine Lisp. It is notable as the first programming language to include mixins. Symbolics used it for its Lisp machines, and eventually developed it into New Flavors; both the original and new Flavors were message-passing OO models. It was hugely influential in the development of the Common Lisp Object System (CLOS).

Implementations of Flavors are also available for Common Lisp.

New Flavors replaced message sending with calling generic functions.

Flavors offers :before and :after daemons with the default method combination (called :daemon).

== Flavors and CLOS features comparison ==
Flavors offers a few features not found in CLOS:

- Wrappers
- Automatic lexical access to slots using variables within methods.
- Internal flavor functions, macros and substs.
- Automatically generated constructors.
- DEFFLAVOR options: :required-methods, :abstract-flavor, :mixture.
- SEND function for sending messages.

CLOS offers the following features not found in Flavors:

- Multimethods
- Methods specialized on individual objects (via EQL).
- Methods specialized on Common Lisp types (symbol, integer, ...).
- Methods specialized on def-struct types.
- Class slots.

== Terminology ==
Flavors terminology
Flavors	CLOS
flavor	class
component flavor	superclass
dependent flavor	subclass
local component flavor	direct superclass
local dependent flavor	direct subclass
generic function	generic function
combined method	effective method
method option	method qualifier
instance	instance
instance variable	slot
ordering of flavor components	class precedence list
