= List of Lisp-family programming languages =

The programming language Lisp is the second-oldest high-level programming language with direct descendants and closely related dialects still in widespread use today. The language Fortran is older by one year. Lisp, like Fortran, has changed a lot since its early days, and many dialects have existed over its history. Today, the most widely known general-purpose Lisp dialects are Common Lisp and Scheme.

Language	Year begun	Created by (at)	Comments	References
ACL2	1990	Robert Boyer, J Moore, Matt Kaufmann	A Computational Logic for Applicative Common Lisp consists of a programming language, an extensible theory in a first-order logic, and a mechanical theorem prover	
Arc	2008	Paul Graham	Dialect of Lisp developed by Paul Graham and Robert Morris	
AutoLISP	1986	David Betz	Built to include and use with the full version of AutoCAD and its derivatives	
BBN LISP	1966	BBN	Based on L. Peter Deutsch's Lisp implementation for PDP-1, which was developed from 1960 to 1964; in time language was expanded until it became its own separate dialect in 1966; later renamed Interlisp	
Chez Scheme	1985	R. Kent Dybvig	Scheme dialect	
Chialisp	2019	Bram Cohen	Lisp-like language, focus on security and auditability; commonly used on Chia blockchain to lock funds in smart coins until spent and released by their owner, enabling behavior similar to a smart contract	
Chicken	2000	Felix Winkelmann	Scheme dialect	
Clojure	2007	Rich Hickey	Lisp dialect, emphasizes functional programming; runs on Java virtual machine, Common Language Runtime, and JavaScript engines; like other Lisps, treats code as data (homoiconicity) and has a macro system	
ANSI Common Lisp	1994	ANSI X3J13 committee	Common Lisp enhanced and standardized, published in ANSI standard document ANSI INCITS 226-1994; to the features of Common Lisp, it adds the loop macro, and the Common Lisp Object System (CLOS) to provide object-oriented programming paradigm with multiple dispatch (multimethods), and method combinations; runs on many platforms: Unix, Linux, macOS, Windows, JVM, JavaScript, Unix/C, LLVM/C++, Android, iOS	
Common Lisp	1984		Lisp dialect first standardized in a book, "Common Lisp the Language", by Guy L. Steele, developed as a standardized and improved successor of Maclisp; statically and dynamically scoped; strongly-typed, allows (optional) type declarations; separate namespaces for functions versus data variables, a trait often named Lisp-2; object-oriented programming is possible via libraries such as Flavors, CommonLOOPS, and later CLOS; treats code as data (homoiconicity) and has a macro system; The reader is extensible via reader macros	
Dylan	1992	Apple Computer	Mostly based on Scheme and Common Lisp, was designed as system and application programming language by Apple; first used to write an operating system and applications for internal prototypes of the later released Apple Newton computer; first official version of Apple Dylan also had s-expression based syntax; Apple collaborated with partners to develop this language	
Emacs Lisp	1985	Richard Stallman	Often referred to as Elisp, used by GNU Emacs and XEmacs text editors to implement most editing functions built into Emacs	
EuLisp	1990		Statically and dynamically scoped Lisp dialect developed by a loose formation of industrial and academic Lisp users and developers across Europe; the standardizers intended to create a new Lisp "less encumbered by the past" (compared to Common Lisp), and not so minimalist as Scheme, and to integrate the object-oriented programming paradigm well	
Fennel	2016	Calvin Rose	Compiles to Lua. Full Lua compatibility: Easily call any Lua function or library from Fennel and vice-versa.	
Franz Lisp	1980	Richard Fateman	Written at UC Berkeley by the students of Professor Richard J. Fateman, based largely on Maclisp and distributed with the Berkeley Software Distribution (BSD) for the Digital Equipment Corp (DEC) VAX	
Game Oriented Assembly Lisp (GOAL)	2000s	Andy Gavin	Video game programming language developed by Andy Gavin and the Jak and Daxter team at Naughty Dog; written using Allegro Common Lisp; used in developing the full game series	
Hy	2013	Paul Tagliamonte	A lisp with tight integration with Python	
Ikarus	2007	Abdulaziz Ghuloum	Scheme dialect	
Interlisp	1967	BBN	Programming environment built around a version of Lisp language; development began in 1967 at Bolt, Beranek and Newman in Cambridge, Massachusetts as BBN LISP, which ran on PDP-10 machines running the TENEX operating system; when Danny Bobrow, Warren Teitelman, and Ronald Kaplan moved from BBN to Xerox PARC, it was renamed Interlisp	
ISLISP	1997	WG16	Small core language to help bridge the gap between differing Lisp dialects	
Janet	2017	Calvin Rose	Lisp-like programming language designed for system scripting and embedding within other programs, particularly those written in C or C++	
Le Lisp	1981	INRIA	Designed by Jérôme Chailloux, Emmanuel St. James, INRIA	
Lisp Flavored Erlang (LFE)	2008	Robert Virding	Lisp dialect built on Core Erlang and the Erlang virtual machine BEAM	
Lisp Machine Lisp	1984		Sometimes named Zetalisp, is a direct descendant of Maclisp; was developed in the mid to late 1970s as the systems programming language for the MIT Lisp machines	
Lispkit Lisp	1980	Peter Henderson	A lexically scoped, purely functional subset of Lisp ("Pure Lisp") developed as a testbed for functional programming concepts.	
Maclisp	1966	Project MAC	Originated at MIT's Project MAC in late 1960s; based on Lisp 1.5; Richard Greenblatt was main developer of original codebase for the PDP-6; Jon L. White was responsible for later maintenance and development	
MultiLisp	1980s	Robert H. Halstead	Scheme dialect, extended with constructs for parallel computing, executing, and shared memory; also had some unusual garbage collection and task scheduling algorithms	
NIL	1970s	MIT	32-bit Lisp implementation developed at MIT; intended as successor to Maclisp; NIL stood for New Implementation of LISP, and was in part a response to DECs VAX computer	
OpenLisp	1988	Christian Jullien	ISLISP compatible language with many Common Lisp extensions; runs on most modern operating systems	
Owl Lisp	2012	Aki Helin	Pure functional Scheme dialect; based on applicable subset of the R7RS standard; has been extended mainly with threads and the data structures needed for purely functional operation	
PicoLisp	1988	Alexander Burger	Open-source Lisp dialect; runs on Linux and other POSIX-compliant systems; most prominent features are simplicity and minimalism	
Portable Standard Lisp	1980	University of Utah	Tail-recursive dynamically bound Lisp dialect inspired by its predecessor, Standard Lisp and the Portable Lisp Compiler; it implements the Reduce computer algebra system	
Racket	1994	PLT Inc.	General purpose, multi-paradigm programming language in the Lisp-Scheme family; one of its design goals is to serve as a platform for language creation, design, and implementation; it is used in many contexts such as scripting, general-purpose programming, computer science education, and research	
Scheme	1975	Guy L. Steele, Gerald Sussman	Functional programming language with a minimalist design philosophy specifying a small standard core with powerful tools for language extension	
Scheme In One Defun (SIOD)	1988	George J. Carrette	Small Scheme implementation, written in C language, made to embed in C programs	
SKILL	1990	Cadence Design Systems	Used as a scripting language and PCell description language used in many EDA software suites by Cadence	
T	1984	Jonathan A. Rees, Norman I. Adams	Scheme dialect developed in the early 1980s by Jonathan A. Rees, Kent M. Pitman, and Norman I. Adams of Yale University as an experiment in language design and implementation	
TXR	2009	Kaz Kylheku	Consists of a Lisp dialect (TXR Lisp) and a pattern language for processing text (TXR Pattern Language)	

== Timeline ==
Timeline of Lisp dialects
1958	1960	1965	1970	1975	1980	1985	1990	1995	2000	2005	2010	2015	2020
LISP 1, 1.5, LISP 2^{(abandoned)}
		Maclisp
			Interlisp
			MDL
				Lisp Machine Lisp
				Scheme				R5RS		R6RS	R7RS small
				NIL
					ZIL (Zork Implementation Language)
					Franz Lisp
					muLisp
					Common Lisp		ANSI standard
					Le Lisp
					MIT Scheme
					XLISP
						T
						Chez Scheme
						Emacs Lisp
						AutoLISP
						PicoLisp
						Gambit
							EuLisp
							ISLISP
							OpenLisp
							PLT Scheme				Racket
							newLISP
							GNU Guile
									Visual LISP
										Clojure
										Arc
										LFE
											Hy

== See also ==
- GNU Common Lisp
- CLISP
