= Hubski =

Social networking and discussion site

- Website: hubski.com
- Registration: Optional (required to submit, comment, or vote)
- Launched: December 2010
- Current status: Active
- Written in: Arc

Hubski is a social networking and discussion site, built by Mark Katakowski. A month after creating the site, Katakowski was joined by Steve Clausnitzer, another Ann Arbor resident.

Hubski has been designed as alternative to Reddit. In addition to sharing content from around the web, users are encouraged to share their own original content. Hubski started out as a clone of Hacker News, and is still written in Arc, the dialect of Lisp created by Paul Graham.

== Features ==
Hubski has a variety of features to help users share content; some of them are commonly found on other aggregators, some not so often:

- Mechanisms for filtering by tags, users, and domains
- Embedding magnet links
- RSS feeds for users, topics, and new posts
- Personal tags for posts
- Per-user configurable themes
- Responsive design to accommodate users of varying screen sizes
