= Dialog Control Language =

Dialog Control Language (DCL) is a high-level description language and interpreter within AutoCAD for creating simple graphical dialogs. AutoLISP extensions use it to interact with the user in the AutoCAD environment.

== Features and usage ==
Unlike other major GUI APIs, DCL is not a complete GUI toolkit for application programming. It is only intended for providing simple dialogs within AutoCAD. It includes basic form widgets such as text boxes, buttons, checkboxes and list boxes. DCL is object-oriented; it allows re-use through inheritance and composition.

DCL syntax is based on defining and using 'tiles'. A 'tile' represents a GUI widget such as a text box or a text label. Tiles also represent widgets that hold other widgets, such as columns, radio button groups and the dialogs themselves. DCL provides built-in tiles for all major widgets, and new tiles can be defined through inheritance and composition of other tiles.

DCL allows interactions with the dialog at run-time by Lisp code. Certain widgets can have actions associated with them by naming an AutoLISP function to be run, and values to be passed to it. Unlike other types of GUIs, DCL dialogs cannot be changed substantially at run time. The contents of certain widgets such as text boxes and list boxes can be changed, but widgets cannot be removed from or added to the dialog.

== Example ==
Here is an example DCL file (and accompanying AutoLISP file) demonstrating the major features of DCL.

name_button : button {
 label = "Submit name";
 action = "(change-name)"; 
}

hello : dialog {
 label = "DCL Example";
 
 : edit_box {
 label = "Name: ";
 key = "name";
 }

 : name_button {
 key = "submit-name";
 }

 : text {
 key = "greeting";
 }

 ok_only;
}

The dialog is created by inheriting from the built-in tile 'dialog'. Properties are set on the dialog and other widgets in name/value pairs. Tiles can be placed inside the dialog just by naming them, or by naming them and specifying additional properties. A new tile ('name_button') is defined for use by naming it and specifying properties for it.

; DCL is saved as "hello.dcl"
(defun change-name ()
  (set_tile "greeting" (strcat "Hello, " (get_tile "name") "!")))

(setq hello-dcl (load_dialog "hello.dcl"))
(new_dialog "hello" hello-dcl)
(start_dialog)
(unload_dialog hello-dcl)

A DCL dialog is instantiated by calling a series of functions in an AutoLisp file. Tiles can call back into AutoLISP code on certain events, and Lisp can manipulate the contents of tiles while the dialog is running.

== Alternative technologies ==
For creating more general GUIs and other extensions within CAD, AutoDesk provides several other choices. The ObjectARX API for C++ allows extensions to be built as within Microsoft Visual Studio. VBA allows drag-and-drop programming for AutoCAD as for Microsoft Office and other applications.

As of AutoCAD 2007 and later, AutoLISP or Visual-LISP programs can call routines written in Visual Studio .NET (VB or C#). Programmers can now create dialogs in VB or C# that have the full range of controls found in the .NET Forms API and can be called and accessed from Visual-LISP.
