= SRFI =

SRFI may refer to:

- Scheme Requests for Implementation, an effort to coordinate libraries and extensions of the Scheme programming language
- Squash Racquets Federation of India, the apex body for the squash racquet sport in India
