= Alice K. Hartley =

American computer scientist (1937–2017)

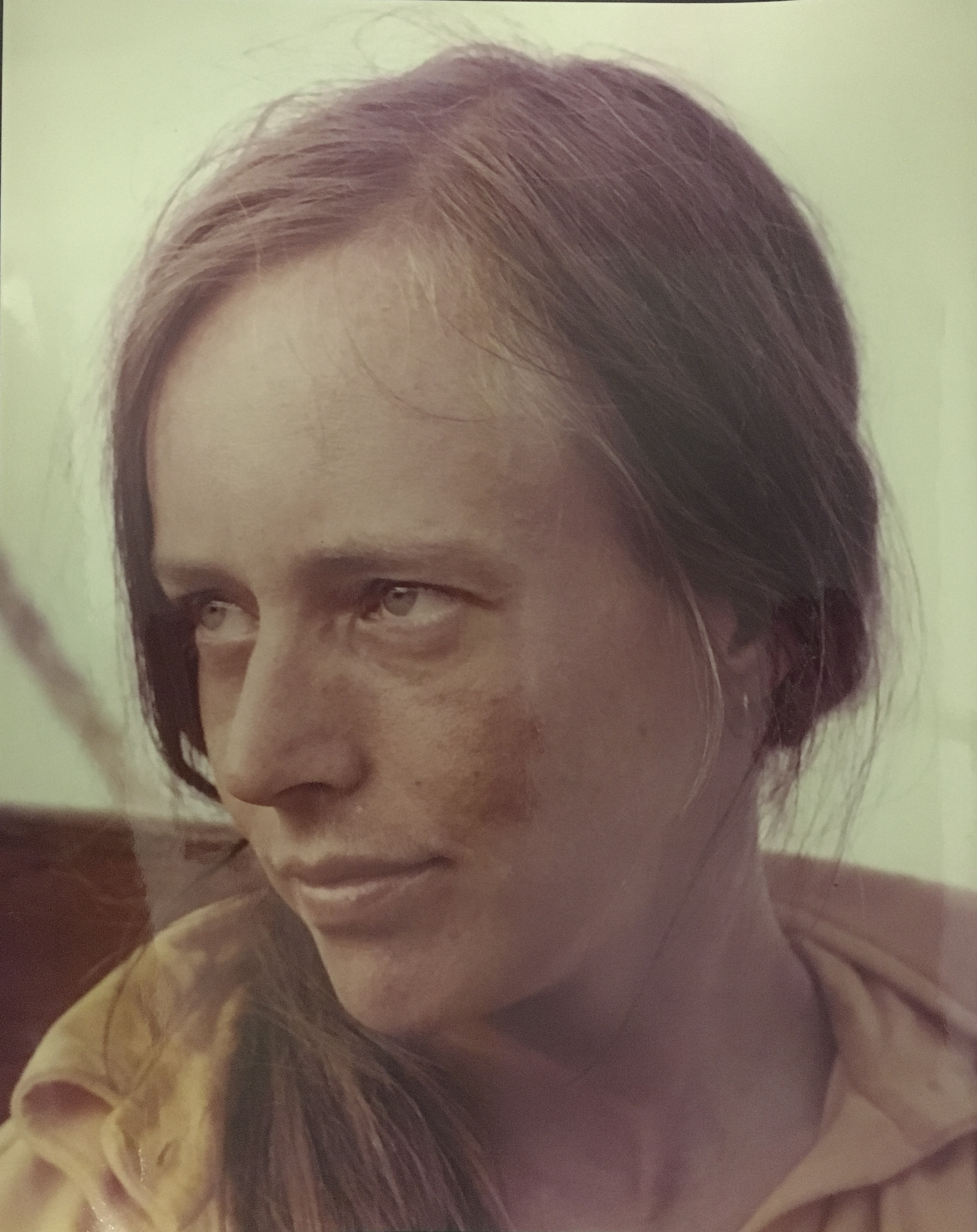
- Born: December 13, 1937; Bridgeport, Connecticut, United States
- Died: June 29, 2017 (aged 79); Boston, Massachusetts
- Education: Massachusetts Institute of Technology MSc Physics, June 12, 1959
- Alma mater: Massachusetts Institute of Technology
- Known for: Lisp, Interlisp, ANSI Common Lisp
- Scientific career
- Workplaces: Massachusetts Institute of Technology, Litton Industries, MIT, BBN, Paladian Systems, Apple Computer
- Thesis: An investigation of clusters on two-lane highways (1959)
- Doctoral advisor: P. M. Morse

Alice Hartley (1937–2017) was an American computer scientist and businesswoman. Hartley worked on several dialects of Lisp, implementing multiple parts of Interlisp, maintaining Macintosh Common Lisp, and developing concepts in computer science and programming language design still in use today. In 1974, Alice K. Hartley was listed as the maintainer of the “Basic System” of Interlisp (including the interpreter, I/O routines, garbage collector, and core subroutines).

Hartley was a hobby gamer, playing and advising on early computer games in the 1970s and 1990s. Hartley was also an antiques collector, importer and dealer, and was the proprietor of Elephant & Castle, an antiques store in Boston.

Hartley spent her career as a researcher at Litton Industries, MIT, BBN, an early employee and Vice President of Technology at Paladian Systems, and an engineer at Apple Computer before retiring in Boston, Massachusetts.

== Early life ==
Alice Hartley was born in Bridgeport, Connecticut on December 13, 1937, to Lowell James Hartley of Minneapolis, Minnesota and Rachel Matilda Virta of Aura, Finland. Hartley graduated from Bassick High School in Bridgeport and was valedictorian of the class of 1955. She was a member of the Newtonians science club and a cheerleader. She also participated in other activities like swimming and was a member of the French Club. She was a finalist in the Fourteenth Annual Westinghouse Science Talent Search. Hartley was accepted into MIT in 1955 on a General Motors Scholarship. She graduated with MSc in Physics on June 12, 1959.

== Career ==
After graduating from MIT with a degree in physics in 1959, Hartley worked an American government contractor, Melpar, for two years. While working for the American government contractor, she worked on projects involving S&P stock market averages, helicopter simulations, and numerical utilities.

In 1961, Alice Hartley co-wrote a “Study program of pattern recognition research” With George S. Sebestyen at Litton Systems Inc. This is the earliest record of her research-related employment outside of MIT.

Following Litton Industries, Alice Hartley worked as a Senior Scientist at BBN Technologies (Bolt Beranek and Newman Inc.) from as early as 1969 when she “took over Dan Murphy’s role in BBN Lisp” and added a number of new data types to the system including; “arrays, strings, large numbers, floating point numbers”.

During her time at BBN, Hartley co-developed the concept of the spaghetti stack with Daniel G. Bobrow, a form of stack tracing functionality in Interlisp which brought early debugging tools to the programming community. Hartley also worked with Douglas W. Clark on the implementation of the list-linearizing garbage collector.

Hartley is listed as the maintainer of Interlisps Basic System in the 1974 “Interlisp Reference Manual” alongside Warren Teitelman (User Facilities) and JW Goodman (Special Arithmetic Functions). It reads:

A. K. Hartley Basic system: i.e., interpreter, input/output, garbage collector; plus all subrs, i.e. hand-coded machine language functions such as PRINT, CONS, PROG, GO, etc.; plus compiler.

Hartley is thanked by Paul Graham in the introduction to ANSI Common Lisp and is mentioned as a collaborator by Guy Steele in The Evolution of Lisp.

Hartley resigned from BBN on November 7, 1984 to join a new AI engineering firm, Palladian Software, Inc, as Vice President of Technology, where she worked until 1987. While at Palladian, Hartley lead the development of various “Artificial Intelligence” systems for financial modeling and trading in the financial markets.

After Palladian Software Inc, Hartley worked for Apple Computers on Allegro Common Lisp and tools for using Lisp on the Macintosh. Hartley single-handedly maintained Macintosh Common Lisp until 2007 when she open-sourced the source code under LLGPL.
