= Cell (EDA) =

A cell in the context of electronic design automation (EDA) is an abstract representation of a component within a schematic diagram or physical layout of an electronic circuit in software.

A cell-based design methodology is a technique that enables designers to analyze chip designs at varying levels of abstraction. For example, one designer may focus on the logical function (high-level) and another may concentrate on physical implementation (low-level). The technique also enables designers to reuse components in more complex designs without understanding all of the implementation details.

== See also ==
- Standard cell
- PCell
- Integrated circuits
- Circuit design
