= Hacker News =

American social news website

- Website type: News aggregator
- Available in: English
- Owner: Y Combinator
- Founder: Paul Graham
- Website: news.ycombinator.com
- Registration: Optional, required for posting and voting
- Launched: February 19, 2007; 19 years ago as Startup News
- Current status: Online
- Written in: Arc

Hacker News (HN) is an American social news website focusing on computer science and entrepreneurship. It is run by the investment fund and startup accelerator Y Combinator. In general, content that can be submitted is defined as "anything that gratifies one's intellectual curiosity."

The word hacker in "Hacker News" is used in its original meaning and refers to the hacker culture which consists of people who enjoy tinkering with technology.

== History ==
The site was created by Paul Graham in February 2007. Initially called Startup News or occasionally News.YC. it became known by its current name on August 14, 2007. It developed as a project of Graham's company Y Combinator, functioning as a real-world application of the Arc programming language which Graham co-developed.

At the end of March 2014, Graham stepped away from his leadership role at Y Combinator, leaving Hacker News administration in the hands of other staff members. The site is currently moderated by Daniel Gackle who posts under the username dang and Tom Howard who posts under the username tomhow. Gackle co-moderated Hacker News with Scott Bell (username sctb) until 2019 when Bell stopped working on the site.

== Vision and practices ==
The intention was to recreate a community similar to the early days of Reddit. However, unlike Reddit where new users can immediately both upvote and downvote content, Hacker News does not allow users to downvote content until they have accumulated 501 "karma" points. Karma points are calculated as the number of upvotes a given user's content has received minus the number of downvotes. "Flagging" comments, likewise, is not permitted until a user has 30 karma points.

Graham stated he hopes to avoid the Eternal September that results in the general decline of intelligent discourse within a community. The site has a proactive attitude in moderating content, including automated flame and spam detectors and active human moderation. It also practices stealth banning in which user posts stop appearing for others to see, unbeknownst to the user. Additional software is used to detect "voting rings to purposefully vote up stories".

According to a 2013 TechCrunch article: "Graham says that Hacker News gets a lot of complaints that it has a bias toward featuring stories about Y Combinator startups, but he says there is no such bias. [...] Graham adds that he gets a lot of vitriol from users personally with accusations of bias or censoring."

== See also ==
- Slashdot
- Reddit
