= ISLISP =

Programming language in the Lisp family

- Paradigms: Multi-paradigm: functional, procedural, object-oriented, reflective, meta
- Family: Lisp
- Designed by: Many
- Developers: Many
- Implementation language: C, C#, Go, Java, JavaScript, Lisp
- Platform: IA-32, x86-64
- OS: Windows, macOS, Linux, BSD, AIX, Solaris, Android, QNX

Dialects
- dayLISP, Easy-ISLisp, Iris, Isle ISLISP, ISLisproid, Kiss, OKI ISLISP, OpenLisp, PRIME-LISP

Influenced by
- Common Lisp, EuLisp, Le Lisp, Scheme

ISLISP (also capitalized as ISLisp) is a programming language in the Lisp family standardized by the International Organization for Standardization (ISO) and International Electrotechnical Commission (IEC) joint working group ISO/IEC JTC 1/SC 22/WG 16 (commonly termed simply SC22/WG16 or WG16). The primary output of this working group was an international standard, published by ISO. The standard was updated in 2007 and republished as ISO/IEC 13816:2007(E). Although official publication was through ISO, versions of the ISLISP language specification are available that are believed to be in the public domain.

The goal of this standards effort was to define a small, core language to help bridge the gap between differing dialects of Lisp. It attempted to accomplish this goal by studying primarily Common Lisp, EuLisp, Le Lisp, and Scheme and standardizing only those features shared between them.

Timeline of Lisp dialects
1958	1960	1965	1970	1975	1980	1985	1990	1995	2000	2005	2010	2015	2020
LISP 1, 1.5, LISP 2^{(abandoned)}
		Maclisp
			Interlisp
			MDL
				Lisp Machine Lisp
				Scheme				R5RS		R6RS	R7RS small
				NIL
					ZIL (Zork Implementation Language)
					Franz Lisp
					muLisp
					Common Lisp		ANSI standard
					Le Lisp
					MIT Scheme
					XLISP
						T
						Chez Scheme
						Emacs Lisp
						AutoLISP
						PicoLisp
						Gambit
							EuLisp
							ISLISP
							OpenLisp
							PLT Scheme				Racket
							newLISP
							GNU Guile
									Visual LISP
										Clojure
										Arc
										LFE
											Hy

== Design goals ==
ISLISP has these design goals:

- Compatible with extant Lisp dialects where feasible
- Provide basic functionality
- Object-oriented
- Design for extensibility
- Prioritize industrial needs over academic needs
- Promote efficient implementations and applications

ISLISP has separate function and variable namespaces (hence it is a Lisp-2).

ISLISP's object system, ILOS, is mostly a subset of the Common Lisp Object System (CLOS).

== Major differences from Common Lisp ==
- There is a global lexical variable defining operator defglobal.
- References to dynamic variables must be made explicitly using the dynamic operator.
- Keywords are not self-evaluating.
- Destructuring is not supported in defmacro.

== Implementations ==
ISLISP implementations have been made for many operating systems including Windows, most Unix and POSIX based, Android, MS-DOS, and OS/2.

Implementations for hardware computer architectures include: x86, x86-64, IA-64, SPARC, SPARC9, PowerPC, MIPS, Alpha, PA-RISC, ARM, AArch64

ISLISP implementations
Name	Creator	Complete ISLisp	Architecture	Written in	Operating system	License	Source code available
OpenLisp	Eligis	Yes	interpreter, compiles to C	C, Lisp	Windows, macOS, Linux, BSD, AIX, Solaris, QNX	Proprietary	Partial
OKI ISLISP	Kyoto University and Oki Electric Industry Co.	Yes	Bytecode machine, compiles to bytecode	C	Windows	?	No
Prime-Lisp	Mikhail Semenov	Yes	Interpreter	C#	Windows	Proprietary, Shareware, freely redistributable binaries	No
Iris	Masaya Taniguchi	No	Interpreter	Go	any	Open source, Mozilla Public License 2.0	Yes
Iris web REPL	Masaya Taniguchi	No	Interpreter, compiles to JavaScript	Go, JavaScript	Browser	Open source, Mozilla Public License 2.0	Yes
Kiss	Yuji Minejima	No, not yet	Interpreter	C, Lisp	any	Open source, GPL v3+	Yes
ISLisproid	Hiroshi Gomi	No	Interpreter	Java	Android	Proprietary	No
dayLISP	Matthew Denson	No	Interpreter	Java, Lisp	Any	Open source, BSD	Yes
Easy-ISLisp	Kenichi Sasagawa	Yes	Interpreter, compiles to C	C, Lisp	Linux, MacOS, OpenBSD	Open source, BSD	Yes
Isle ISLISP	KIM Taegyoon	Yes	Compiler	Common Lisp	OSes on which Common Lisp operates (including Linux and Windows)	Open source, Unlicense	Yes
islisp-compat	Derek Newhall	Yes	Package on top of Common Lisp	Common Lisp	OSes on which Common Lisp operates (including Linux and Windows)	Open source, CDDL	Yes

Two older implementations are no longer available:

- TISL, by Masato Izumi and Takayasu Ito (Tohoku University), was an interpreter and compiler.
- G-LISP, by Josef Jelinek, was a Java applet.
