= T (programming language) =

Dialect of the Scheme programming language

- Paradigms: Multi-paradigm: object-oriented, imperative, functional, meta
- Family: Lisp
- Designed by: Jonathan A. Rees; Norman I. Adams
- Developers: same
- First appeared: 1982; 43 years ago
- Final release: 3.0 / August 1, 1984; 40 years ago
- Typing discipline: dynamic, strong
- Platform: Cross-platform
- OS: Cross-platform
- Website: mumble.net/~jar/tproject

Influenced by
- Scheme

Influenced
- EuLisp, Joule

T is a dialect of the Scheme programming language developed in the early 1980s by Jonathan A. Rees, Kent M. Pitman, and Norman I. Adams of Yale University as an experiment in language design and implementation.

== Rationale ==
T's purpose is to test the thesis developed by Guy L. Steele Jr. and Gerald Jay Sussman in their series of papers about Scheme: that Scheme may be used as the basis for a practical programming language of exceptional expressive power, and that implementations of Scheme could perform better than other Lisp systems, and competitively with implementations of programming languages, such as C and BLISS, which are usually considered to be inherently more efficient than Lisp on conventional machine architectures. Much of this occurs via an optimizing compiler named Orbit.

T contains some features that modern Scheme lacks. For example, T is object-oriented, and it has first-class environments, called locales, which can be modified non-locally and used as a module system. T has several extra special forms for lazy evaluation and flow control, and an equivalent to Common Lisp's setf. T, like Scheme, supports call-with-current-continuation (call/cc), but it also has a more limited form called catch. From the T manual, a hypothetical implementation of cons could be:

 (define-predicate pair?)
 (define-settable-operation (car pair))
 (define-settable-operation (cdr pair))
 (define (cons the-car the-cdr)
         (object nil
                 ((pair? self) t)
                 ((car self) the-car)
                 ((cdr self) the-cdr)
                 (((setter car) self new-car) (set the-car new-car))
                 (((setter cdr) self new-cdr) (set the-cdr new-cdr))))

This example shows that objects in T are intimately related to closures and message-passing. A primitive called join puts two objects together, allowing for something resembling inheritance.

Timeline of Lisp dialects
1958	1960	1965	1970	1975	1980	1985	1990	1995	2000	2005	2010	2015	2020
LISP 1, 1.5, LISP 2^{(abandoned)}
		Maclisp
			Interlisp
			MDL
				Lisp Machine Lisp
				Scheme				R5RS		R6RS	R7RS small
				NIL
					ZIL (Zork Implementation Language)
					Franz Lisp
					muLisp
					Common Lisp		ANSI standard
					Le Lisp
					MIT Scheme
					XLISP
						T
						Chez Scheme
						Emacs Lisp
						AutoLISP
						PicoLisp
						Gambit
							EuLisp
							ISLISP
							OpenLisp
							PLT Scheme				Racket
							newLISP
							GNU Guile
									Visual LISP
										Clojure
										Arc
										LFE
											Hy

== Ports ==
T was ported to many hardware platforms and operating systems, including:

- MIPS: DEC 3100 (pmax), SGI IRIS
- Motorola 68000 (m68k): Apollo Domain/OS, HP/UX, Mac/AUX, NeXT, SunOS 3
- NS320xx (n32k): Encore Multimax
- SPARC: SunOS 4 and above, Solaris, Unix on Connection Machine 5
- VAX: Ultrix
