= OpenLisp =

Family of programming languages

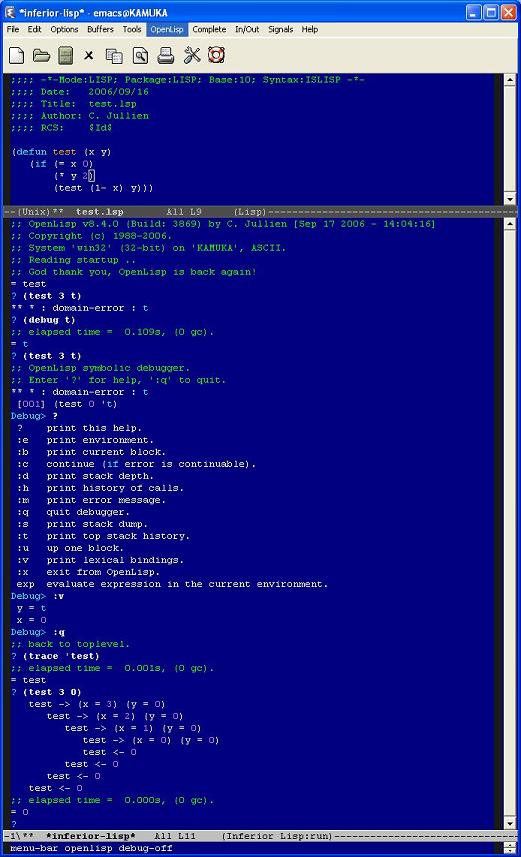
- OpenLisp running inside Emacs
- Paradigms: Multi-paradigm: functional, procedural, object-oriented, reflective, meta
- Family: Lisp
- Designed by: Christian Jullien
- Developer: Christian Jullien
- First appeared: April 1988; 38 years ago
- Stable release: 11.7.0 / 13 December 2022; 3 years ago
- Typing discipline: Dynamic, strong
- Implementation language: C, OpenLisp
- Platform: x86, x86-64, IA-64, SPARC, PowerPC, MIPS, Alpha, PA-RISC, ARM, AArch64, RISC-V, Loongson
- OS: Windows, most Unix-based, Linux, macOS, FreeBSD, OpenBSD, NetBSD, Solaris, HP-UX, AIX, QNX, DOS, OS/2, Pocket PC, OpenVMS, z/OS, Cygwin
- License: Proprietary
- Website: christian.jullien.free.fr

Influenced by
- Lisp, ISLISP

OpenLisp is a programming language in the Lisp family developed by Christian Jullien from Eligis. It conforms to the international standard for ISLISP published jointly by the International Organization for Standardization (ISO) and International Electrotechnical Commission (IEC), ISO/IEC 13816:1997(E), revised to ISO/IEC 13816:2007(E).

Written in the programming languages C and Lisp, it runs on most common operating systems. OpenLisp is designated an ISLISP implementation, but also contains many Common Lisp-compatible extensions (hashtable, readtable, package, defstruct, sequences, rational numbers) and other libraries (network socket, regular expression, XML, Portable Operating System Interface (POSIX), SQL, Lightweight Directory Access Protocol (LDAP)).

OpenLisp includes an interpreter associated to a read–eval–print loop (REPL), a Lisp Assembly Program (LAP) and a backend compiler for the language C.

== Goals ==
The main goal of this Lisp version is to implement a fully compliant ISLISP system (when launched with --islisp flag, it is strictly restricted to ISO/IEC 13816:2007(E) specification). The secondary goal is to provide a complete embeddable Lisp system linkable to C/C++ or Java (via Java Native Interface (JNI)). A callback mechanism is used to communicate with the external program. Other goals are to be usable as scripting language or glue language and to produce standalone program executables.

== License ==
Despite its name, OpenLisp is proprietary software. Its interpreter is available free of charge for any noncommercial use.

== User interface ==
OpenLisp mainly runs in console mode: cmd.exe on Microsoft Windows, and terminal emulator on Unix-based systems.

 ;; OpenLisp v11.x.y (Build: XXXX) by C. Jullien [Jan 01 20xx - 10:49:13]
 ;; Copyright (c) Eligis - 1988-20xx.
 ;; System 'sysname' (64-bit, 8 CPU) on 'hostname', ASCII.
 ;; God thank you, OpenLisp is back again!
 ? (fib 20)
 ;; elapsed time = 0.003s, (0 gc).
 = 6765
 ? _

Alternate solutions include running OpenLisp from Emacs via setting up Emacs inferior-lisp-mode, or using an integrated development environment (IDE) which supports OpenLisp syntax. LispIDE by DaanSystems does so natively.

== Technology ==
=== Memory manager ===
Internally, OpenLisp uses virtual memory to allocate and extend objects automatically. Small objects of the same type are allocated using a Bibop (BIg Bag Of Pages) memory organization. Large objects use a proxy which point to the real object in Lisp heap. The conservative garbage collection is a mark and sweep with coalescing heap (sweep phase can be configured to use threads).

=== Data types ===
OpenLisp uses tagged architecture (4 bits tag on 32-bit, 5 bits tag on 64-bit) for fast type checking (small integer, float, symbol, cons, string, vector). Small integers (28 bits on 32-bit, 59 bits on 64-bit) are unboxed, large (32/64-bit) integers are boxed. As required by ISLISP, arbitrary-precision arithmetic (bignums) are also implemented. Characters (hence strings) are either 8-bit (ANSI, EBCDIC) or 16/32-bit if Unicode support is enabled.

=== Evaluator and compiler ===
The Lisp Kernel, native interpreter and basic libraries are hand coded in the language C, LAP intermediate language produced by the compiler is then translated to C by the C backend code generator.

== History ==
In 1988, the very first motive behind OpenLisp was to implement a Lisp subset to extend EmACT, an Emacs clone. ISLISP became an obvious choice quickly. Further development ensued.

OpenLisp milestones
| Year | Version | Main feature |
|---|---|---|
| 1988 | 1.0 | OpenLisp begun as a toy language named MLisp (Minimal Lisp) to experiment with ideas from ISLISP standards process |
| 1993 | 3.3 | First port on 64-bit machine (DEC Alpha OSF/1); name change from MLisp to OpenLisp |
| 1994 | 4.0 | First commercial use |
| 1995 | 4.5 | Socket streams support |
| 1997 | 5.7 | OpenLisp is first Lisp to implement ISLISP ISO/IEC 13816:1997(E) standard. |
| 1998 | 5.8 | Unicode optional support |
| 2000 | 6.6 | Lisp to LAP compiler; LAP is interpreted by a virtual machine embedded in OpenLisp; speed improved about 2x |
| 2003 | 7.5 | Lisp to C backend; able to compile an application with many Lisp files to a standalone executable; speed improved from 10x to 20x |
| 2007 | 8.7 | Changes to match ISO/IEC 13816:2007(E) revision |
| 2010 | 9.2 | Native integer arbitrary-precision arithmetic support |
| 2021 | 11.2 | Added complete CLtL format extension; improve heap detection |
| 2022 | 11.4 | Rework of activation blocks makes interpreter around 15% faster. Experimental ASDF clone. |
| 2022 | 11.5 | Generic function calls are ~3x faster. Improved regex internal module. |
| 2022 | 11.6 | Add <simple-bit-vector> type and related BIT functions similar to CLtL equivalent. |
| 2022 | 11.7 | Current version |

Timeline of Lisp dialects
| 1958 | 1960 | 1965 | 1970 | 1975 | 1980 | 1985 | 1990 | 1995 | 2000 | 2005 | 2010 | 2015 | 2020 |
|---|---|---|---|---|---|---|---|---|---|---|---|---|---|
| LISP 1, 1.5, LISP 2^{(abandoned)} |
| | | Maclisp |
| | | | Interlisp |
| | | | MDL |
| | | | | Lisp Machine Lisp |
| | | | | Scheme | | | | R5RS | | R6RS | R7RS small |
| | | | | NIL |
| | | | | | ZIL (Zork Implementation Language) |
| | | | | | Franz Lisp |
| | | | | | muLisp |
| | | | | | Common Lisp | | ANSI standard |
| | | | | | Le Lisp |
| | | | | | MIT Scheme |
| | | | | | XLISP |
| | | | | | | T |
| | | | | | | Chez Scheme |
| | | | | | | Emacs Lisp |
| | | | | | | AutoLISP |
| | | | | | | PicoLisp |
| | | | | | | Gambit |
| | | | | | | | EuLisp |
| | | | | | | | ISLISP |
| | | | | | | | OpenLisp |
| | | | | | | | PLT Scheme | | | | Racket |
| | | | | | | | newLISP |
| | | | | | | | GNU Guile |
| | | | | | | | | | Visual LISP |
| | | | | | | | | | | Clojure |
| | | | | | | | | | | Arc |
| | | | | | | | | | | LFE |
| | | | | | | | | | | | Hy |

== Ports ==
OpenLisp runs on many operating systems including Windows, most Unix and POSIX based (Linux, macOS, FreeBSD, OpenBSD, NetBSD, Solaris, HP-UX, AIX, Cygwin, QNX), MS-DOS, OS/2, Pocket PC, OpenVMS, z/OS. The official website download section contains over 50 versions.

== Standard libraries ==
=== Connectors ===
OpenLisp can interact with modules written in C using foreign function interface (FFI), ISLISP streams are extended to support network socket (./net directory includes samples for Hypertext Transfer Protocol (http), JavaScript Object Notation (JSON), Post Office Protocol 3 (POP3), Simple Mail Transfer Protocol (SMTP), Telnet, Rss), a simplified Extensible Markup Language (XML) reader can convert XML to Lisp. A basic SQL module can be used with MySQL, Odbc, SQLite, PostgreSQL. A comma-separated values (CSV) module can read and write CSV files.

=== Tools ===
Developer tools include data logging, pretty-printer, profiler, design by contract programming, and unit tests.

=== Algorithms ===
Some well known algorithms are available in ./contrib directory (Dantzig's simplex algorithm, Dijkstra's algorithm, Ford–Fulkerson algorithm). Modules are shipped using BSD licenses.

== Origin of name ==
The prefix Open refers to open systems not to the open-source model.

The name was chosen in 1993 to replace the MLisp internal code name which was already used by Gosling Emacs (as successor of Mocklisp).

OpenLisp programming language is different than OpenLISP, a project begun in 1997 to implement Locator/Identifier Separation Protocol.

== Compiler ==
This section describes how a compiler transforms Lisp code to C.

=== Source code ===
The Fibonacci number function (this classic definition used in most benchmarks is not the most efficient way to compute fib)

(defun fib (n)
   (cond ((eq n 1) 1)
         ((eq n 2) 1)
         (t (+ (fib (- n 1)) (fib (- n 2))))))

=== LAP intermediate code ===
Lisp compiler translates Lisp source code to the following intermediate code. It is followed by a peephole optimization pass that uses this intermediate format to analyze and optimize instructions. After optimization, final LAP code is:

  ((fentry fib 1 0 0)
   (param 0)
   (jeq _l004 '1)
   (jneq _l003 '2)
   (move a1 '1)
   (return)
  _l003
   (gsub1 a1)
   (recurse 1)
   (move a2 a1)
   (param 0)
   (gsub a1 '2)
   (recurse 1)
   (gadd a2 a1)
  _l004
   (return)
   (end))

=== C code translation ===
Finally, C code generator uses LAP code to translate instructions in C.

static POINTER 
OLDEFCOMPILED1(olfib_00, p1) {
        POINTER a1;
        POINTER VOLATILE a2;

        ollapenter(SN_OLFIB_00);
        a1 = p1;
        if (eq(a1, olmakefix(1))) goto _l004;
        if (!eq(a1, olmakefix(2))) goto _l003;
        ollapleave(SN_OLFIB_00);
        return olmakefix(1);
_l003:
        a1 = ollapgsub(a1, olmakefix(1));
        a2 = olfib_00(a1);
        a1 = ollapgsub(p1, olmakefix(2));
        a1 = olfib_00(a1);
        a1 = ollapgadd(a2, a1);
_l004:
        ollapleave(SN_OLFIB_00);
        return a1;
}

== Style guide ==
=== Line length ===
OpenLisp accepts lines having unlimited length. The recommended style is that each line of text in code should have at most 80 characters per line.

== Adoption ==
It has been chosen by SDF Public Access Unix System nonprofit public access Unix systems on the Internet as one of its programming languages available online.

Bricsys uses OpenLisp to implement AutoLISP in its Bricscad computer-aided design (CAD) system.

MEVA is entirely written with OpenLisp.

Università degli Studi di Palermo uses OpenLisp to teach Lisp.
