= PicoLisp =

Programming language, a dialect of the language Lisp

- Paradigms: Functional, procedural, object-oriented, declarative, reflective, meta
- Family: Lisp
- Designed by: Alexander Burger
- First appeared: 1988; 37 years ago
- Typing discipline: duck, dynamic, strong
- Implementation language: LLVM, PicoLisp
- OS: POSIX
- License: MIT
- Filename extensions: .l
- Website: picolisp.com

Dialects
- Ersatz PicoLisp, miniPicoLisp

PicoLisp is a programming language, a dialect of the language Lisp. It runs on operating systems including Linux and others that are Portable Operating System Interface (POSIX) compliant. Its most prominent features are simplicity and minimalism. It is built on one internal data type: a cell. On the language level, a programmer can use three different data types (numbers, symbols, and lists) being represented by cells and differentiated by bits at the end of the cell. It is free and open-source software released under an MIT License (X11).

== Features ==
Functions can accept arbitrary types and numbers of arguments. Macros are needed only in rare cases and are implemented using the quote function. PicoLisp does not include Lisp's lambda function. This is because the quote function is changed to return all its arguments unevaluated, not only the car of the first.

A special feature is the intrinsic create, read, update, and delete (CRUD) functioning. Persistent symbols are first-class citizens (objects), they are loaded from database files automatically when accessed, and written back when modified. Applications are written using a class hierarchy of entities and relations.

Other features include: Prolog engine, database engine and database queries, distributed databases, inlining of C language functions and native C function calls, child process management, interprocess communication, browser graphical user interface (GUI), and internationalization and localization.

== History ==
The design of PicoLisp is most similar to the first version of MacLisp, Interlisp and mainly Portable Standard Lisp. It was ported to DOS and SCO Unix. Since 1993, it was used mainly on Linux. In the mid-1990s, database functions were added.

The first versions were written in a mix of C and assembly language. In 1999, a first rewrite from scratch was done, fully in C. In 2002, that version was released under a GNU General Public License (GNU GPL). In 2010, it changed to an MIT/X11 license.

In 2009, the 64-bit version was released, another rewrite, this time written in generic assembly, which in turn is implemented in PicoLisp. This version adds support for coroutines.

In December 2010, a Java version named Ersatz PicoLisp was released.

In September 2014, Burger announced the PilMCU project on the PicoLisp development listserv, an effort with George Orais to implement PicoLisp in hardware directly.

In July 2015, Burger announced PilOS - The PicoLisp Operating System, a minimal prototype based on the modification of PilMCU targeting embedded applications. It runs on standard x86-64 PC hardware, directly off the BIOS and includes all the features of 64-bit PicoLisp (minus native function calls, due to the fact there is no other native environment such as the C standard library); in principle, it works as its own operating system.

In the summer of 2016, development of PilBox ("PicoLisp Box") – a generic Android app allowing to write apps in pure PicoLisp – was started. It is still being developed and maintained.

In 2021, PicoLisp was re-implemented in LLVM and released as pil21. The source language which is compiled to LLVM-IR is also in PicoLisp syntax.

Timeline of Lisp dialects
1958	1960	1965	1970	1975	1980	1985	1990	1995	2000	2005	2010	2015	2020
LISP 1, 1.5, LISP 2^{(abandoned)}
		Maclisp
			Interlisp
			MDL
				Lisp Machine Lisp
				Scheme				R5RS		R6RS	R7RS small
				NIL
					ZIL (Zork Implementation Language)
					Franz Lisp
					muLisp
					Common Lisp		ANSI standard
					Le Lisp
					MIT Scheme
					XLISP
						T
						Chez Scheme
						Emacs Lisp
						AutoLISP
						PicoLisp
						Gambit
							EuLisp
							ISLISP
							OpenLisp
							PLT Scheme				Racket
							newLISP
							GNU Guile
									Visual LISP
										Clojure
										Arc
										LFE
											Hy
