= Le Lisp =

Dialect of Lisp developed in France

- Paradigms: Multi-paradigm: functional, procedural, reflective, meta
- Family: Lisp
- Designed by: Jérôme Chailloux; Emmanuel St. James; Matthieu Devin; Jean-Marie Hullot
- Developer: French Institute for Research in Computer Science and Automation (INRIA)
- First appeared: 1981; 45 years ago
- Stable release: 15.26.13 / 8 January 2020; 6 years ago
- Implementation language: C, LLM3, Le Lisp
- Platform: Exormacs, VAX, 68000, Apple II, IBM PC, IBM 3081, PerkinElmer 32, x86, SPARC, PowerPC, MIPS, Alpha
- OS: VERSAdos, CP/M, OpenVMS Windows, Unix, Linux, Classic Mac OS, macOS, FreeBSD, Solaris, HP-UX, AIX
- License: Proprietary until 2020, 2-clause BSD License since 2020
- Website: Official Website at the Wayback Machine (archived 2024-05-16)

Influenced by
- Lisp

Influenced
- ISLISP, OpenLisp

Le Lisp (also Le_Lisp and Le-Lisp) is a programming language, a dialect of the language Lisp.

== Programming language ==
It was developed at the French Institute for Research in Computer Science and Automation (INRIA), to be an implementation language for a very large scale integration (VLSI) workstation being designed under the direction of Jean Vuillemin. Le Lisp also had to run on various incompatible platforms (mostly running Unix operating systems) that were used by the project. The main goals for the language were to be a powerful post-Maclisp version of Lisp that would be portable, compatible, extensible, and efficient.

Jérôme Chailloux led the Le Lisp team, working with Emmanuel St. James, Matthieu Devin, and Jean-Marie Hullot in 1980. The dialect is historically noteworthy as one of the first Lisp implementations to be available on both the Apple II and the IBM PC.

On 2020-01-08, INRIA agreed to migrate the source code to the 2-clause BSD License which allowed few native ports from ILOG and Eligis to adopt this license model.

Timeline of Lisp dialects
1958	1960	1965	1970	1975	1980	1985	1990	1995	2000	2005	2010	2015	2020
LISP 1, 1.5, LISP 2^{(abandoned)}
		Maclisp
			Interlisp
			MDL
				Lisp Machine Lisp
				Scheme				R5RS		R6RS	R7RS small
				NIL
					ZIL (Zork Implementation Language)
					Franz Lisp
					muLisp
					Common Lisp		ANSI standard
					Le Lisp
					MIT Scheme
					XLISP
						T
						Chez Scheme
						Emacs Lisp
						AutoLISP
						PicoLisp
						Gambit
							EuLisp
							ISLISP
							OpenLisp
							PLT Scheme				Racket
							newLISP
							GNU Guile
									Visual LISP
										Clojure
										Arc
										LFE
											Hy
