= Forever Labs =

American longevity research company

- Founded: 2015; 11 years ago in Ann Arbor, Michigan
- Services: cryopreservation of bone marrow
- Website: foreverlabs.com

Forever Labs is a longevity company that uses an outpatient procedure to harvest adult Mesenchymal stem cells for possible future medical treatment. While the collection and storage of infant cord blood has become commonplace since the 1990s, Forever Labs is notable for being the first company to offer collection and storage of adult stem cells.

== History ==
Forever Labs was founded in Ann Arbor, Michigan in 2015 by Dr. Mark Katakowski, Dr. Ben Buller, Dr. Laith Farjo, and Steven Clausnitzer. After initial launch in Michigan, the company now operates in eight states. In the summer of 2017, Forever Labs was invited to participate in the Silicon Valley Incubator Y Combinator.

== Procedure ==
Forever Labs contracts with licensed physicians to perform the collection procedure. The patient lies on his/her side, the area just above the hip is disinfected and locally anesthetized. The physician then uses a special syringe to collect the bone marrow. The cells are spun down with special centrifuge devices, cooled and shipped off to the long term storage facility. The entire process typically takes 15–20 minutes.

== Storage and future use ==
The patient's stem cells are stored in a clinical-grade cryogenic biorepository for future withdrawal, expansion, and use in disease prevention, longevity treatments, and regenerative medical treatments.

Hundreds of clinical trials are currently underway studying the effects of stem cell therapy.
