= Franz Lisp =

Lisp programming language system

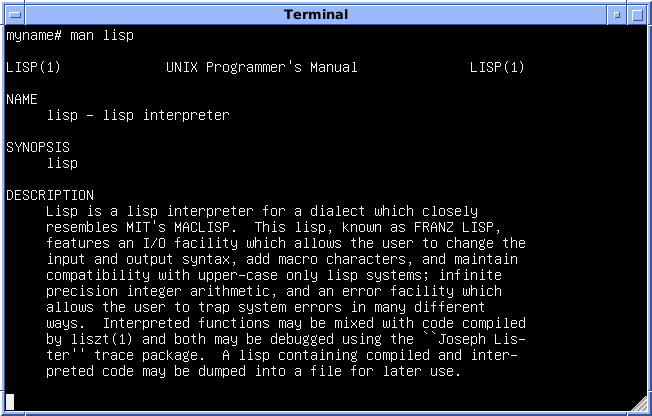
- 4.3 BSD from the University of Wisconsin, displaying a Franz Lisp man page
- Paradigms: Multi-paradigm: functional, procedural, reflective, meta
- Family: Lisp
- Designed by: Richard Fateman, John Foderaro, Kevin Layer, Keith Sklower
- Developer: University of California, Berkeley
- First appeared: 1980; 45 years ago
- Final release: Final / 1988; 37 years ago
- Typing discipline: Dynamic, strong
- Scope: Static, lexical
- Implementation language: C, Franz Lisp
- Platform: VAX, 68000
- OS: VMS, Unix, Unix-like, Eunice, SunOS
- License: Proprietary, freeware

Influenced by
- Lisp, Maclisp, Common Lisp

Influenced
- Allegro Common Lisp

In computer programming, Franz Lisp is a discontinued Lisp programming language system written at the University of California, Berkeley (UC Berkeley, UCB) by Professor Richard Fateman and several students, based largely on Maclisp and distributed with the Berkeley Software Distribution (BSD) for the Digital Equipment Corporation (DEC) VAX minicomputer. Piggybacking on the popularity of the BSD package, Franz Lisp was probably the most widely distributed and used Lisp system of the 1970s and 1980s.

The name is a pun on the composer and pianist Franz Liszt.

It was written specifically to be a host for running the Macsyma computer algebra system on VAX. The project began at the end of 1978, soon after UC Berkeley took delivery of their first VAX 11/780 (named Ernie CoVax, after Ernie Kovacs, the first of many systems with pun names at UCB). Franz Lisp was available free of charge to educational sites, and was also distributed on Eunice, a Berkeley Unix emulator that ran on VAX VMS.

== History ==
At the time of Franz Lisp's creation, the Macsyma computer algebra system ran mainly on a DEC PDP-10. This computer's limited address space caused difficulties. Attempted remedies included ports of Maclisp to Multics or Lisp machines, but even if successful, these would only be solutions for the Massachusetts Institute of Technology (MIT) as these machines were costly and uncommon. Franz Lisp was the first example of a framework where large Lisp programs could be run outside the Lisp machines environment; Macsyma was then considered a very large program. After being ported to Franz Lisp, Macsyma was distributed to about 50 sites under a license restricted by MIT's interest in making Macsyma proprietary. The VAX Macsyma that ran on Franz Lisp was called Vaxima. When Symbolics Inc., bought the commercial rights to Macsyma from MIT to sell along with its Lisp machines, it eventually was compelled to sell Macsyma also on DEC VAX and Sun Microsystems computers, paying royalties to the University of California for the use of Franz Lisp.

Other Lisp implementations for the VAX were MIT's NIL (never fully functional), University of Utah's Portable Standard Lisp, DEC's VAX Lisp, Xerox's Interlisp-VAX, and Le Lisp.

In 1982, the port of Franz Lisp to the Motorola 68000 processor was begun. In particular, it was ported to a prototype Sun-1 made by Sun Microsystems, which ran a variant of Berkeley Software Distribution (BSD) Unix called SunOS. In 1986, at Purdue University, Franz Lisp was ported to the CCI Power 6/32 platform, code named Tahoe.

The major contributors to Franz Lisp at UC Berkeley were John K. Foderaro, Keith Sklower, and Kevin Layer.

A company was formed to provide support for Franz Lisp called Franz Inc., by founders Richard Fateman, John Foderaro, Fritz Kunze, Kevin Layer, and Keith Sklower, all associated with UC Berkeley. After that, development and research on Franz Lisp continued for a few years, but the acceptance of Common Lisp greatly reduced the need for Franz Lisp. The first product of Franz Inc. was Franz Lisp running on various Motorola 68000-based workstations. A port of Franz Lisp was even done to VAX VMS for Lawrence Berkeley National Laboratory. However, almost immediately Franz Inc. began work on their implementation of Common Lisp, Allegro Common Lisp.

Timeline of Lisp dialects
1958	1960	1965	1970	1975	1980	1985	1990	1995	2000	2005	2010	2015	2020
LISP 1, 1.5, LISP 2^{(abandoned)}
		Maclisp
			Interlisp
			MDL
				Lisp Machine Lisp
				Scheme				R5RS		R6RS	R7RS small
				NIL
					ZIL (Zork Implementation Language)
					Franz Lisp
					muLisp
					Common Lisp		ANSI standard
					Le Lisp
					MIT Scheme
					XLISP
						T
						Chez Scheme
						Emacs Lisp
						AutoLISP
						PicoLisp
						Gambit
							EuLisp
							ISLISP
							OpenLisp
							PLT Scheme				Racket
							newLISP
							GNU Guile
									Visual LISP
										Clojure
										Arc
										LFE
											Hy

== Features ==
The Franz Lisp interpreter was written in C and Franz Lisp. It was bootstrapped solely using the C compiler. The Franz Lisp compiler, written entirely in Franz Lisp, was called Liszt, completing the pun on the name of the composer Franz Liszt.

Some notable features of Franz Lisp were arrays in Lisp interchangeable with arrays in Fortran and a foreign function interface (FFI) which allowed interoperation with other languages at the binary level. Many of the implementation methods were borrowed from Maclisp: bibop memory organization (BIg Bag Of Pages), small integers represented uniquely by pointers to fixed values in fields, and fast arithmetic.

== Important applications ==
- Franz Lisp was used as the example language in Robert Wilensky's first edition of Lispcraft
- An implementation of OPS5 by DEC on Franz Lisp was used as the basis for a rule-based system for configuring VAX-11 computer system orders and was important to DEC's sales of these computers
- Slang: a circuit simulator used to design and test the reduced instruction set computer RISC-I microprocessor
- As a derivative: Cadence Design Systems Skill programming language

== See also ==
- PC-LISP is an implementation of Franz Lisp for MS-DOS which still runs on emulators and Windows.
