= Setf =

Setf or SETF may refer to:

- Social Exclusion Task Force
- Sociedad Explotadora de Tierra del Fuego, a former sheep-farming company.
- Southeast Toyota Finance, a division of JM Family Enterprises
- State Employees and Teachers Federation
- setf, a special form in Common Lisp and Lisp that uses its first argument to define a place in memory then evaluates its second argument and stores the returned value at the memory location
- Submarine escape training facility
  - Submarine Escape Training Facility (Australia)
- Syrian Emergency Task Force
