= Arc (programming language) =

Open-source programming language

- Paradigms: Multi-paradigm: functional, meta, procedural
- Family: Lisp
- Designed by: Paul Graham
- Developers: Paul Graham, Robert Tappan Morris, Arc community
- First appeared: 29 January 2008; 18 years ago
- Stable release: 3.2 / 28 October 2018; 8 years ago
- Typing discipline: Dynamic
- Implementation language: Racket, Common Lisp
- Platform: IA-32, x86-64
- OS: Linux
- License: Artistic License 2.0
- Filename extensions: .arc
- Website: arclanguage.org

Major implementations
- Arc, Anarki, Arcadia, Rainbow

Influenced by
- Lisp, Scheme

Arc is a programming language, a dialect of the language Lisp, developed by Paul Graham and Robert Morris. It is free and open-source software released under the Artistic License 2.0.

== History ==
In 2001, Paul Graham announced that he was working on a new dialect of Lisp named Arc. Over the years since, he has written several essays describing features or goals of the language, and some internal projects at Graham's startup business incubator named Y Combinator have been written in Arc, most notably the Hacker News web forum and news aggregator program. Arc was originally written in Racket, but as of September 2024 it had largely been replaced at Y Combinator by a version called Clarc using the Common Lisp implementation SBCL.

== Motives ==
In the essay Being Popular Graham describes a few of his goals for the language. While many of the goals are very general ("Arc should be hackable", "there should be good libraries"), he did give some specifics. For example, he believes it is important for a language to be terse:

It would not be far from the truth to say that a hacker about to write a program decides what language to use, at least subconsciously, based on the total number of characters he'll have to type. If this isn't precisely how hackers think, a language designer would do well to act as if it were.

He also stated that it is better for a language to only implement a small number of axioms, even when that means the language may not have features that large organizations want, such as object-orientation (OO). Further, Graham thinks that OO is not useful as its methods and patterns are just "good design", and he views the language features used to implement OO as partly mistaken. At Arc's introduction in 2008, Graham stated one of its benefits was its brevity.

A controversy among Lisp programmers is whether, and how much, the s-expressions of the language should be complemented by other forms of syntax. Graham thinks that added syntax should be used in situations where pure s-expressions would be overly verbose, saying, "I don't think we should be religiously opposed to introducing syntax into Lisp." Graham also thinks that efficiency problems should be solved by giving the programmer a good profiler.

=== Reception ===
When released in 2008, Arc generated mixed reactions, with some calling it simply an extension to Lisp or Scheme and not a programming language in its own right. Others applauded Arc for stripping Lisp down to bare essentials. Shortly after its release, Arc was ported to JavaScript, and was being supported by Schemescript, an integrated development environment (IDE) based on Eclipse.

== Examples ==
Hello world in Arc :

 (prn "Hello, World")

To illustrate Arc's terseness, Graham uses a brief program. It produces a form with one field at the url "/said". When the form is submitted, it leads to a page with a link that says "click here", which then leads to a page with the value of the original input field.

(defop said req
  (aform [onlink "click here" (pr "you said: " (arg _ "foo"))]
    (input "foo") 
    (submit)))

== Versions ==
=== Official versions ===
The first publicly released version of Arc was made available on 29 January 2008, implemented on Racket (named PLT-Scheme then). The release comes in the form of a .tar archive, containing the Racket source code for Arc. A tutorial and a discussion forum are also available. The forum uses the same program that Hacker News does, and is written in Arc.

As of November 2019 there were two additional implementations of Arc, one targeting JavaScript called Jilt and another targeting Common Lisp called Clarc.

=== Unofficial versions ===
Due to lack of updates in the official Arc branch, some members of the Arc community started their own repositories with unofficial modifications, extensions, and libraries. One version, Anarki, permitted anyone to submit changes to the project and has a community managed wiki.

Rainbow is an implementation of Arc in Java.

Arcadia is an implementation of Arc in C.

Arc++ is an implementation of Arc in C++.

=== Timeline of LISP Dialects ===
Timeline of Lisp dialects
1958	1960	1965	1970	1975	1980	1985	1990	1995	2000	2005	2010	2015	2020
LISP 1, 1.5, LISP 2^{(abandoned)}
		Maclisp
			Interlisp
			MDL
				Lisp Machine Lisp
				Scheme				R5RS		R6RS	R7RS small
				NIL
					ZIL (Zork Implementation Language)
					Franz Lisp
					muLisp
					Common Lisp		ANSI standard
					Le Lisp
					MIT Scheme
					XLISP
						T
						Chez Scheme
						Emacs Lisp
						AutoLISP
						PicoLisp
						Gambit
							EuLisp
							ISLISP
							OpenLisp
							PLT Scheme				Racket
							newLISP
							GNU Guile
									Visual LISP
										Clojure
										Arc
										LFE
											Hy
