= Emacs Lisp =

Dialect of Lisp in the Emacs text editor

- Emacs logo
- Paradigm: Functional, meta, reflective
- Family: Lisp
- Designed by: Richard Stallman, Guy L. Steele, Jr.
- Developer: GNU Project
- First appeared: 1985; 41 years ago
- Stable release: 30.2 / 14 August 2025; 14 months ago
- Typing discipline: Dynamic, strong
- Scope: Dynamic, optionally lexical
- Platform: Emacs
- OS: cross-platform
- License: GPLv3
- Filename extensions: .el, .elc, .eln
- Website: gnu.org/emacs

Influenced by
- Common Lisp, Maclisp

Emacs Lisp is a Lisp dialect made for GNU Emacs. It is used for implementing most of the editing functionality built into Emacs, the remainder being written in C, as is the Lisp interpreter.

Emacs Lisp code is used to modify, extend and customize Emacs. Those not wanting to write the code themselves can use the Customize function instead. It provides a set of preferences pages allowing the user to set options and preview their effect in the running Emacs session. When the user saves their changes, Customize simply writes the necessary Emacs Lisp code to the user's config file, which can be set to a special file that only Customize uses, to avoid the possibility of altering the user's own file.

Besides being a programming language that can be compiled to bytecode and to machine code, Emacs Lisp can also function as an interpreted scripting language, much like the Unix Bourne shell or Perl, by calling Emacs in batch mode. In this way it may be called from the command line or via an executable file, and its editing functions, such as buffers and movement commands are available to the program just as in the normal mode. No user interface is presented when Emacs is started in batch mode; it simply executes the passed-in script and exits, displaying any output from the script.

Emacs Lisp is also termed Elisp, although there are also older, unrelated Lisp dialects with that name.

== Compared to other Lisp dialects ==
Emacs Lisp is most closely related to Maclisp, with some later influence from Common Lisp. It supports imperative and functional programming methods. Lisp was the default extension language for Emacs derivatives such as EINE and ZWEI. When Richard Stallman forked Gosling Emacs into GNU Emacs, he also chose Lisp as the extension language, because of its powerful features, including the ability to treat functions as data. Although the Common Lisp standard had yet to be formulated, Scheme existed at the time, but Stallman chose not to use it because of its comparatively poor performance on workstations (relative to the minicomputers that were Emacs' traditional home), and he wanted to develop a dialect which he thought would be more easily optimized.

The Lisp dialect used in Emacs differs substantially from the more modern Common Lisp and Scheme dialects used for applications programming. A prominent characteristic of Emacs Lisp is in its use of dynamic rather than lexical scope by default. That is, a function may reference local variables in the scope it is called from, but not in the scope where it was defined. Recently, there has been an ongoing effort to update code to use lexical scoping, for reasons outlined below.

Timeline of Lisp dialects
1958	1960	1965	1970	1975	1980	1985	1990	1995	2000	2005	2010	2015	2020
LISP 1, 1.5, LISP 2^{(abandoned)}
		Maclisp
			Interlisp
			MDL
				Lisp Machine Lisp
				Scheme				R5RS		R6RS	R7RS small
				NIL
					ZIL (Zork Implementation Language)
					Franz Lisp
					muLisp
					Common Lisp		ANSI standard
					Le Lisp
					MIT Scheme
					XLISP
						T
						Chez Scheme
						Emacs Lisp
						AutoLISP
						PicoLisp
						Gambit
							EuLisp
							ISLISP
							OpenLisp
							PLT Scheme				Racket
							newLISP
							GNU Guile
									Visual LISP
										Clojure
										Arc
										LFE
											Hy

== Example ==
The development of Emacs Lisp was guided by the goal of providing data structures and features specific to making a versatile text editor over implementing a general-purpose programming language. For example, Emacs Lisp cannot easily read a file a line at a time—the entire file must be read into an Emacs buffer. However, Emacs Lisp provides many features for navigating and modifying buffer text at a sentence, paragraph, or higher syntactic level as defined by modes.

Here follows a simple example of an Emacs extension written in Emacs Lisp. In Emacs, the editing area can be split into separate areas called windows, each displaying a different buffer. A buffer is a region of text loaded into Emacs' memory (possibly from a file) which can be saved into a text document.

Users can press the default C-x 2 key binding to open a new window. This runs the Emacs Lisp function split-window-below. Normally, when the new window appears, it displays the same buffer as the previous one. Suppose we wish to make it display the next available buffer. In order to do this, the user writes the following Emacs Lisp code, in either an existing Emacs Lisp source file or an empty Emacs buffer:

(defun my-split-window-func ()
  (interactive)
  (split-window-below)
  (set-window-buffer (next-window) (other-buffer)))

(global-set-key (kbd "C-x 2") #'my-split-window-func)

The first statement, (defun ...), defines a new function, my-split-window-func, which calls split-window-below (the old window-splitting function), then tells the new window to display another (new) buffer. The second statement, (global-set-key ...) re-binds the key sequence "C-x 2" to the new function.

This can also be written using the feature named advice, which allows a user to create wrappers around extant functions instead of defining their own. This has the advantages of not needing keybindings to be changed, of working wherever the original function is called, and of being simpler to write, but the disadvantage of making debugging more complex. For this reason, advice is not allowed in the source code of GNU Emacs, but if a user wishes, the advice feature can be used in their code to reimplement the above code as follows:

(defadvice split-window-below
  (after my-window-splitting-advice first () activate)
  (set-window-buffer (next-window) (other-buffer)))

This instructs split-window-below to execute the user-supplied code whenever it is called, after executing the rest of the function. Advice can also be specified to execute before the original function, around it (literally wrapping the original), or to conditionally execute the original function based on the results of the advice.

Emacs 24.4 replaces this defadvice mechanism with advice-add, which is claimed to be more flexible and simpler. The advice above could be reimplemented using the new system as:

(defun switch-to-next-window-in-split ()
  (set-window-buffer (next-window) (other-buffer)))

(advice-add 'split-window-below :before #'switch-to-next-window-in-split)

These changes take effect as soon as the code is evaluated. It is not necessary to recompile, restart Emacs, or even rehash a configuration file. If the code is saved into an Emacs init file, then Emacs will load the extension the next time it starts. Otherwise, the changes must be reevaluated manually when Emacs is restarted.

== Source code ==
Emacs Lisp source code is stored in filesystems as plain text files, by convention with the filename suffix ".el". The user's init file is an exception, often appearing as ".emacs" despite being evaluated as any Emacs Lisp code. Since the mid-1990s, Emacs also loads ~/.emacs.el and ~/.emacs.d/init.el. Further, users may specify any file to load as a config file on the command line, or explicitly state that no config file is to be loaded. When the files are loaded, an interpreter component of the Emacs program reads and parses the functions and variables, storing them in memory. They are then available to other editing functions, and to user commands. Functions and variables can be freely modified and redefined without restarting the editor or reloading the config file.

In order to save time and memory space, much of the functionality of Emacs loads only when required. Each set of optional features shipped with Emacs is implemented by a collection of Emacs code called a package or library. For example, there is a library for highlighting keywords in program source code, and a library for playing the game of Tetris. Each library is implemented using one or more Emacs Lisp source files. Libraries can define one or more major modes to activate and control their function.

Emacs developers write certain functions in C. These are primitives, also termed built-in functions or subrs. Although primitives can be called from Lisp code, they can only be modified by editing the C source files and recompiling. In GNU Emacs, primitives are not available as external libraries; they are part of the Emacs executable. In XEmacs, runtime loading of such primitives is possible, using the operating system's support for dynamic linking. Functions may be written as primitives because they need access to external data and libraries not otherwise available from Emacs Lisp, or because they are called often enough that the comparative speed of C versus Emacs Lisp makes a worthwhile difference.

However, because errors in C code can easily lead to segmentation violations or to more subtle bugs, which crash the editor, and because writing C code that interacts correctly with the Emacs Lisp garbage collector is error-prone, the number of functions implemented as primitives is kept to a necessary minimum.

=== Byte code ===
Byte-compiling can make Emacs Lisp code execute faster. Emacs contains a compiler which can translate Emacs Lisp source files into a special representation termed bytecode. Emacs Lisp bytecode files have the filename suffix ".elc". Compared to source files, bytecode files load and run faster, occupy less disk space, and use less memory when loaded.

Bytecode still runs more slowly than primitives, but functions loaded as bytecode can be easily modified and re-loaded, and bytecode files are cross-platform software. The standard Emacs Lisp code distributed with Emacs is loaded as bytecode, although the matching source files are usually provided for the user's reference as well. User-supplied extensions are typically not byte-compiled, as they are neither as large nor as computationally intensive.

== Language features ==
The "cl-lib" package implements a fairly large subset of Common Lisp. This package replaces an earlier "cl" package, which would overwrite existing Emacs Lisp function definitions with ones more similar to those found in Common Lisp. The "cl-lib" package, on the other hand, follows Emacs Lisp style guidelines more closely and prefixes each function and macro it defines with "cl-" (e.g., cl-defun, which doesn't conflict with the name of the built-in defun), avoiding the unexpected changes in behavior that could occur whenever the "cl" package was loaded.

Emacs Lisp (unlike some other Lisp implementations) does not do tail-call optimization. Without this, tail recursions can eventually lead to stack overflow.

The apel library aids in writing portable Emacs Lisp code, with the help of the polysylabi platform bridge.

Emacs Lisp is a Lisp-2 like Common Lisp, meaning that it has a function namespace which is separate from the namespace it uses for other variables.

=== From dynamic to lexical scoping ===
Like MacLisp, Emacs Lisp uses dynamic scope, offering static (or lexical) as an option starting from version 24. It can be activated by setting the file local variable lexical-binding. Before this option was added, one could use the lexical-let macro from the (now deprecated) "cl" package to provide effective lexical scope.

In dynamic scoping, if a programmer declares a variable within the scope of a function, it is available to subroutines called from within that function. Originally, this was intended as an optimization; lexical scoping was still uncommon and of uncertain performance. In computer scientist Olin Shivers's recollection, "I asked RMS when he was implementing emacs lisp why it was dynamically scoped and his exact reply was that lexical scope was too inefficient." Dynamic scoping was also meant to provide greater flexibility for user customizations. However, dynamic scoping has several disadvantages. Firstly, it can easily lead to bugs in large programs, due to unintended interactions between variables in different functions. Secondly, accessing variables under dynamic scoping is generally slower than under lexical scoping.
