= Scheme Requests for Implementation =

Scheme Requests for Implementation (SRFI) is an effort to coordinate libraries and extensions of standard Scheme programming language, necessitated by Scheme's minimalist design, and particularly the lack of a standard library before Scheme R6RS. Specific SRFI documents are supported by many scheme implementations. This, in effect, makes SRFI an informal standards process.

== History ==
At the Scheme Workshop held in Baltimore, Maryland, on September 26, 1998, the attendees considered several proposals for standardized feature sets to include in Scheme implementations.

Alan Bawden proposed that there be a repository for library proposals. Shriram Krishnamurthi volunteered to host the library, and Dave Mason and Mike Sperber joined him as initial editors and coordinators of the library process. The term Request for Implementation, a play on the Internet Request for Comments, was coined at the workshop, and modified to Scheme Request for Implementation by the editors.

On November 1, 1998, the srfi-discuss mailing list was established, which had as subscribers many major implementors of Scheme and other contributors to the language. An archive of the discussion is kept online.

The SRFI website, along with the other SRFI procedures, was established in late December 1998.

As of 2023, 245 SRFIs have been published, and new contributions and discussion continue.
