= BBN LISP =

BBN LISP (also stylized BBN-Lisp) was a dialect of the Lisp programming language by Bolt, Beranek and Newman Inc. in Cambridge, Massachusetts. It was based on L. Peter Deutsch's implementation of Lisp for the PDP-1 (called Basic PDP-1 LISP), which was developed from 1960 to 1964. Over time the language was expanded until it became its own separate dialect in 1966.

BBN LISP is most notable for being the predecessor of Interlisp.
