= Mathcad =

Computer system for mathematical calculation

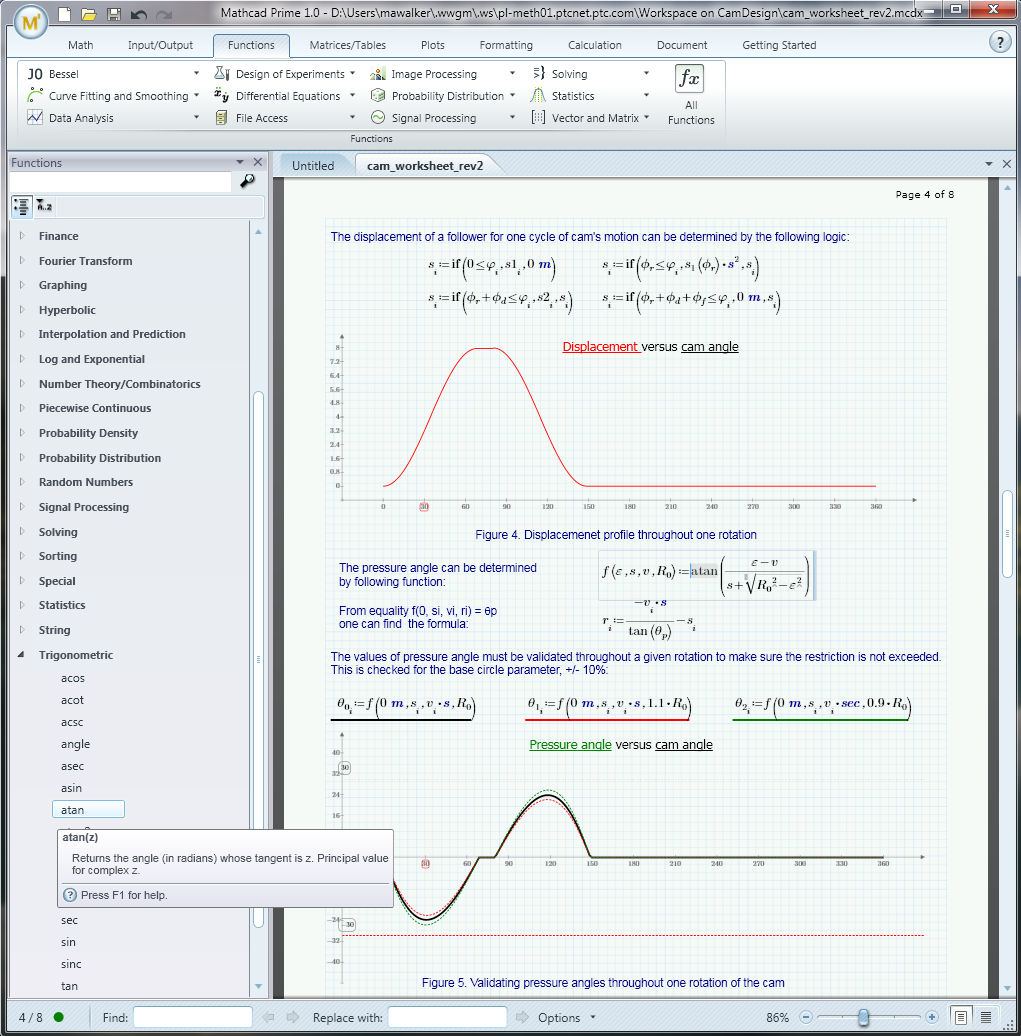
- Mathcad Prime 1.0
- Developers: Mathsoft, PTC
- Release: 1986
- Stable release: Prime 12 (12.0.0.0) / April 8, 2026; 6 months ago
- Operating system: Microsoft Windows
- Available in: 10 languages
- Type: Computer algebra system
- License: Proprietary
- Website: www.mathcad.com

Mathcad is computer software for the verification, validation, documentation and re-use of mathematical calculations in engineering and science, notably mechanical, chemical, electrical, and civil engineering. Released in 1986 for MS-DOS, it introduced live editing (WYSIWYG) of typeset mathematical notation in an interactive notebook, combined with automatic computations. It was originally developed by Mathsoft, and since 2006 has been a product of Parametric Technology Corporation.

== History ==
Mathcad was conceived and developed by Allen Razdow and Josh Bernoff at Mathsoft founded by David Blohm and Razdow. It was released in 1986. It was the first system to support WYSIWYG editing and recalculation of mathematical calculations mixed with text. It was also the first to check the consistency of engineering units through the full calculation. Other equation solving systems existed at the time, but did not provide a notebook interface: Software Arts' TK Solver was released in 1982, and Borland's Eureka: The Solver was released in 1987.

Mathcad was acquired by Parametric Technology Corporation (PTC) in April 2006.

== Overview ==
Mathcad's central interface is an interactive notebook in which equations and expressions are created and manipulated in the same graphical format in which they are presented (WYSIWYG). This approach was adopted by systems such as Mathematica, Maple, Macsyma, MATLAB, and Jupyter.

Mathcad today includes some of the capabilities of a computer algebra system, but remains oriented towards ease of use and documentation of numerical engineering applications.

Mathcad is part of a broader product development system developed by PTC, addressing analytical steps in systems engineering. It integrates with PTC's Creo Elements/Pro, Windchill, and Creo Elements/View. Its live feature-level integration with Creo Elements/Pro enables Mathcad analytical models to be directly used in driving CAD geometry, and its structural awareness within Windchill allows live calculations to be re-used and re-applied toward multiple design models.

== Summary of capabilities ==
The Mathcad interface allows users to combine a variety of different elements (mathematics, descriptive text, and supporting imagery) into a worksheet, in which dependent calculations are dynamically recalculated as inputs change. This allows for simple manipulation of input variables, assumptions, and expressions. Mathcad's functionality includes:

- Numerous numeric functions for statistics, data analysis, image processing, and signal processing;
- Ubiquitous dimensionality checking and simplification;
- Solution of systems of equations, such as ODEs and PDEs using several methods;
- Root finding for polynomials and other functions;
- Symbolic manipulation of mathematical expressions;
- Parametric 2D and 3D plotting and discrete data plotting;
- Leverage standard, readable mathematical expressions within embedded program constructs;
- Vector and matrix operations, including eigenvalues and eigenvectors;
- Curve fitting and regression analysis;
- Statistical and design of experiments functions and plot types, and evaluation of probability distributions;
- Import from and export to other applications and file types, such as Microsoft Excel and MathML;
- Cross references to other Mathcad worksheets;
- Integration with other engineering applications, such as CAD, FEM, BIM, and Simulation tools, to aid in product design, like Autocad, Ansys, Revit.

Although Mathcad is mostly oriented to non-programmers, it is also used in more complex projects to visualize results of mathematical modeling by using distributed computing and coupling with programs written using more traditional languages such as C++.

== Current releases ==
As of 2026, the latest release from PTC is Mathcad Prime 12.0.0.0. This release is a freemium variant: if the software is not activated after a Mathcad Prime 30-day trial, it is possible to continue using PTC Mathcad Express for an unlimited time as "PTC Mathcad Express Free-for-Life Engineering Calculations Software". This freemium pilot is a new marketing approach for PTC. Review and markup of engineering notes can now be done directly by team members without them all requiring a full Mathcad Prime license.

The last release of the traditional (non-Prime) product line, Mathcad 15.0, came out in June 2010 and shares the same worksheet file structure as Mathcad 14.0. The last service release, Mathcad 15.0 M050, which added support for Windows 10, was released in 2017. Mathcad 15.0 and earlier releases are no longer actively developed, sold or supported anymore. PTC recommends users to migrate their Mathcad 15.0 or prior worksheets to the latest supported Prime releases using the XMCD to MCD converter bundled as part of the Prime subscription.

== Computer operating system platforms ==
Mathcad only runs on Microsoft Windows. Mathcad Prime 12.0 requires Windows 11 version 23H2 or later. Until 1998, Mathcad also supported Mac OS. Mathcad 15 M045 and Mathcad Prime 3.1 are the last versions to officially support Windows XP and Windows Vista. Mathcad Prime 6 is the last version to officially support Windows 7, Windows 8, and Windows 8.1. Mathcad Prime 11 is the last version to officially support Windows 10 64-bit.

== Support ==
Starting in 2011 (Mathcad 15.0) the first year of maintenance and support has been included in the purchase or upgrade price.

== Release history ==
Name	Version	Release date	Notes
Mathcad 0.3	0.3		Beta on 5.25-inch floppy diskette
Mathcad 2.5.2	2.5.2	1989	Last version for MS-DOS
Mathcad 3.1	3.1	1992	First version for Windows (with notebook interface)
Mathcad 4.0	4.0		
Mathcad 5.0	5.0		Added Maple based CAS features
Mathcad 5.5	5.5		
Mathcad 6.0	6.0	1995	Last version for Windows 3.1x.
Mathcad 7	7.0	1997	First version for Windows 95.
Mathcad 8			
Mathcad 2000			
Mathcad 2001i			
Mathcad 11			Last version to use MCD file format when saving Mathcad documents.
Mathcad 12			First version to use XMCD or XMCDZ file format when saving Mathcad documents.
Mathcad 13.0	13.0	September 15, 2005	
Mathcad 13.1	13.1		Last version developed by Mathsoft. Last version to officially support Windows 95, 98, ME, NT 4.0, and 2000 Pre-SP4.
Mathcad 14.0	14.0	February 12, 2007	First version developed by PTC. Last version to officially support Windows 2000 SP4.
Mathcad 15.0	15.0 F000	June 25, 2010	
Mathcad 15.0 M010	15.0 M010	June 29, 2011	
Mathcad 15.0 M040	15.0 M040	August 2015	
Mathcad 15.0 M045	15.0 M045	November 2015	Last version to officially support Windows XP and Vista for non-Prime version
Mathcad 15.0 M050	15.0 M050	December 2017	Last traditional (non-Prime) release. Last version to use XMCD or XMCDZ file format when saving Mathcad documents.
Mathcad Prime 1.0	1.0.0.0	January 10, 2011	First version to use MCDX file format when saving Mathcad documents.
Mathcad Prime 2.0	2.0.0.0	February 29, 2012	First version to have native 64-bit version, aside from its native 32-bit version.
Mathcad Prime 3.0	3.0.0.0	October 2, 2013	
Mathcad Prime 3.1	3.1.0.0	March 2, 2015	Last version to officially support Windows XP and Vista
Mathcad Prime 4	4.0.0.0	March 6, 2017	
Mathcad Prime 5	5.0.0.0	August 14, 2018	Last version to have native 32-bit version, aside from its native 64-bit version.
Mathcad Prime 6	6.0.0.0	October 1, 2019	Last version to officially support Windows 7, 8, and 8.1. First version to have native 64-bit version only.
Mathcad Prime 7	7.0.0.0	February 27, 2021	
Mathcad Prime 8	8.0.0.0	March 15, 2022	
Mathcad Prime 9	9.0.0.0	March 14, 2023	
Mathcad Prime 10	10.0.0	April 23, 2024	
Mathcad Prime 11	11.0.0	April 2, 2025	Last version to officially support Windows 10 64-bit.
Mathcad Prime 12	12.0.0	April 8, 2026	First version that requires Windows 11 (23H2 or later).

== Screenshots of various Mathcad releases ==
Mathcad 2.52 (1989)

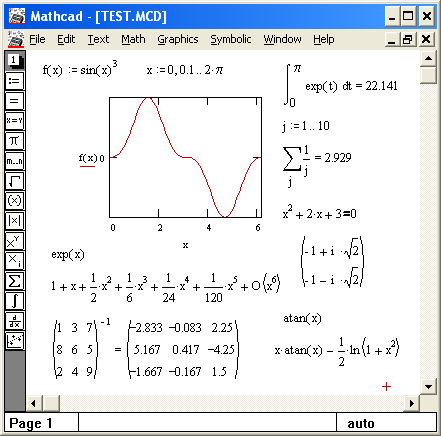
Mathcad 3.1 (1992)

Mathcad PLUS 6.0 (1995)

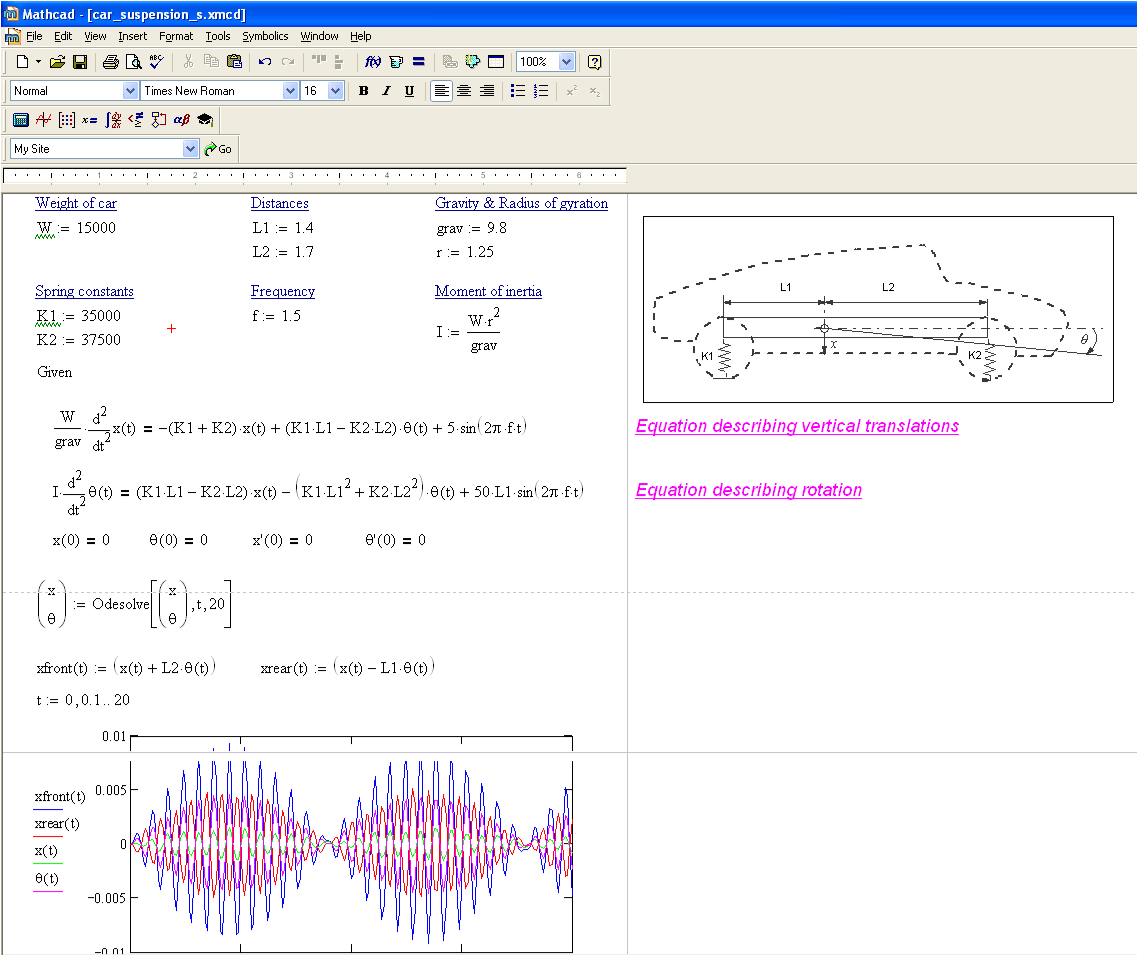
Mathcad 13.0

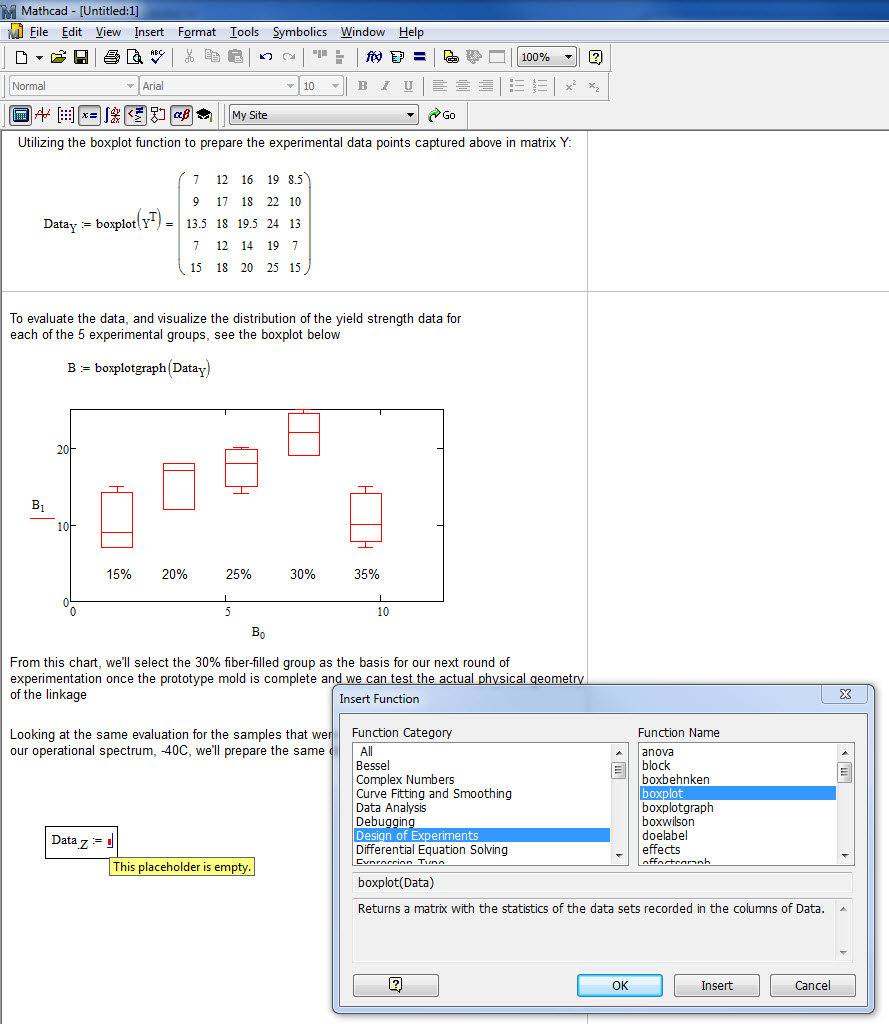
Mathcad 15.0

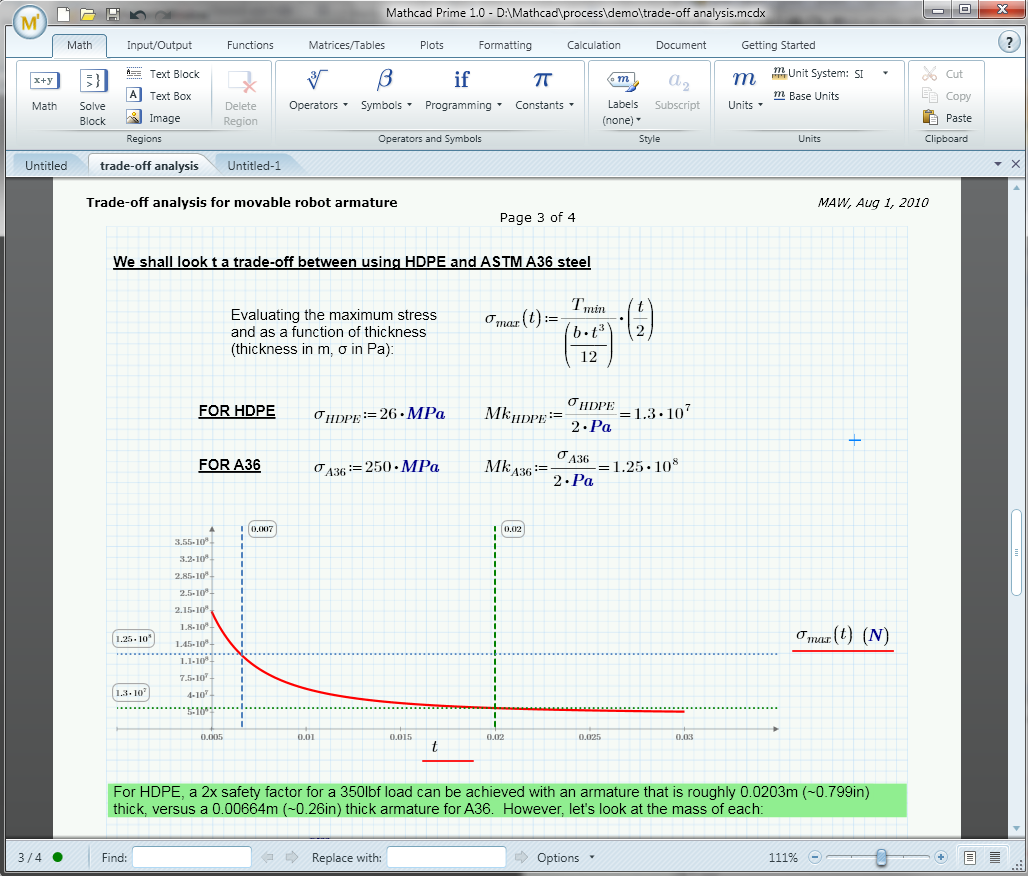
Mathcad Prime 1.0

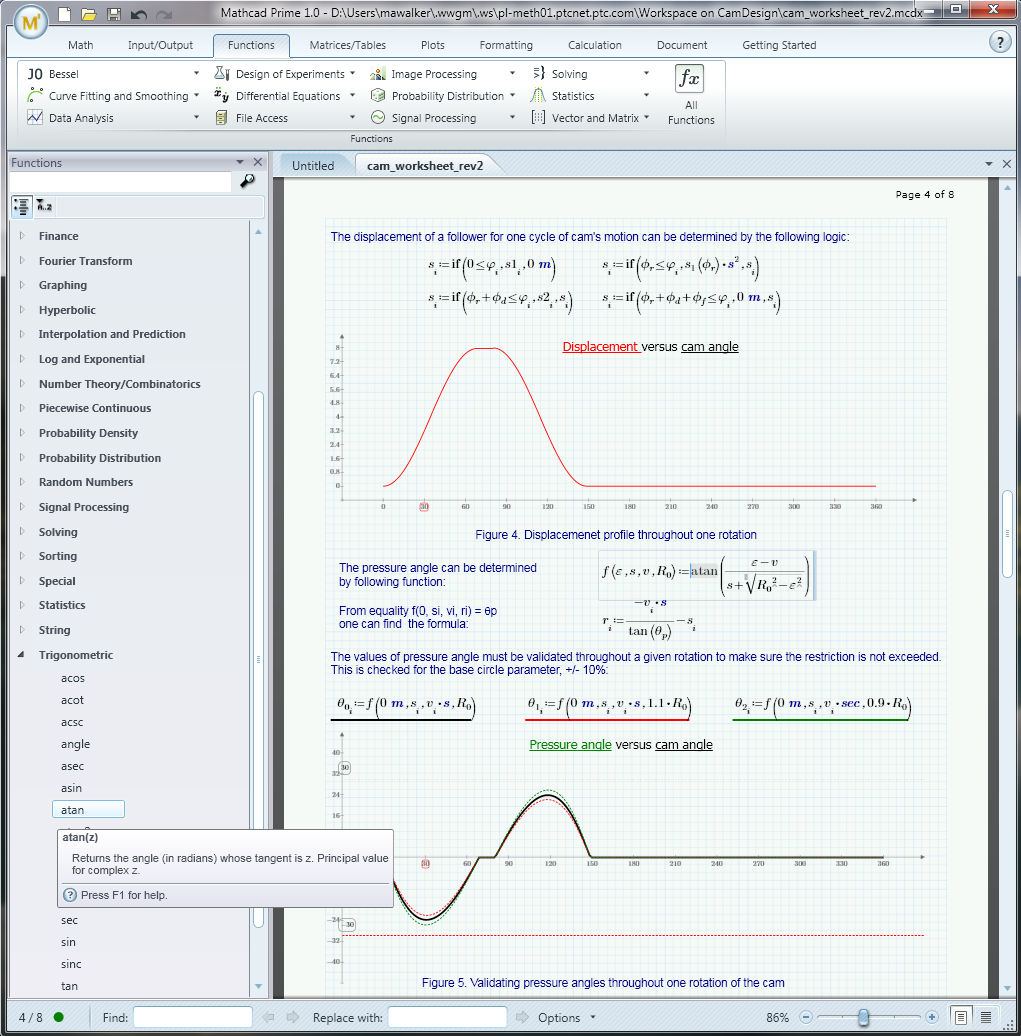
Mathcad Prime 1.0 working session

== See also ==
- Comparison of computer algebra systems
- TK Solver
- PTC:Creo
- PTC:Windchill
- SMath Studio, a free for personal use program similar to Mathcad
