= Michael Genesereth =

American computer scientist

- Born: 15 October 1948 (age 77)
- Education: Massachusetts Institute of Technology; Harvard University
- Known for: Artificial Intelligence; Computational law General game playing
- Awards: AAAI Fellow (1990, Founding).
- Scientific career
- Fields: Computer science Logic
- Workplaces: Stanford University
- Thesis: Automated Consultation for Complex Computer Systems (1978)
- Doctoral advisor: Thomas Cheatham (Harvard); Joel Moses (MIT)
- Doctoral students: Russell Greiner; Jock D. Mackinlay; Stuart J. Russell; Vishal Sikka

Michael Genesereth (born 1948) is an American logician and computer scientist, who is most known for his work on computational logic and applications of that work in enterprise management, computational law, and general game playing. Genesereth is professor in the Computer Science Department at Stanford University and a professor by courtesy in the Stanford Law School. His 1987 textbook on Logical Foundations of Artificial Intelligence remains one of the key references on symbolic artificial intelligence. He is the author of the influential Game Description Language (GDL) and Knowledge Interchange Format (KIF), the latter of which led to the ISO Common Logic standard.

== Education ==
Genesereth received a B.S. in Physics (1972) from Massachusetts Institute of Technology, and both an M.S. (1974) and Ph.D. (1978) in Applied Mathematics from Harvard University. As a graduate student, he worked on the Macsyma computer algebra system and wrote his dissertation on an automated advisor for Macsyma users.

== Career ==
Genesereth has been a faculty member in the computer science department at Stanford University since 1979. He is the director of the Logic Group at Stanford and a founder and the research director of the Stanford CodeX Center for Legal Informatics. He is one of the founders of the companies Teknowledge, CommerceNet, Mergent Systems, SIPX and Symbium. Symbium is the most recent spinoff from the computational law research undertaken by CodeX and is a winner of the Ivory Innovation Prize for Policy and Regulatory Reform.

== Research ==
Genesereth's research is broadly based on the use of computational logic for such applications as integrating knowledge from heterogeneous sources, as a common format for exchanging knowledge, as a foundation for agent-based knowledge representation and software engineering, as an enhancement to spreadsheets known as a Logical spreadsheet, and for optimizing queries in a deductive database system. He invented the notion of Model-based Diagnosis as a contrast with the symptom-based approach then current in systems like Mycin, and this was recognized by its inclusion in a retrospective on fifty volumes of Artificial Intelligence (journal). His work on data integration won the best paper prize at the 1997 Symposium on Principles of Database Systems. His work on deals among rational agents won the influential paper award by the International Foundation for Autonomous Agents and Multiagent Systems in 2007.

== Logic education ==
In 2016, Genesereth launched an effort to bring logic education to high schools across America citing Herbrand semantics as the foundation of the pedagogical approach. The program includes summer camps for high school students offered on the Stanford campus, and teacher professional development offered across different studies in the USA. The high school offerings utilize the same course material as a MOOC on the same topic.

Genesereth is also the Academic Director of The International Logic Olympiad. The Olympiad, which started in 2024, is a worldwide competition in logical reasoning and problem-solving for secondary school students. In its first year, more than 3500 students from 2100 schools in 92 countries participated in the contest.

== Society ==
Genesereth served as the program chair of the Third National Conference of Artificial Intelligence, councilor of American Association for the Advancement of Artificial Intelligence for the term expiring in 1985, and was elected its fellow in 1990. He has also been an organizer of the International General Game Playing Competition, a program chair in 1993 of The Web Conference, a co-organizer of 2010 American Association for the Advancement of Artificial Intelligence Spring Symposium on Intelligent Privacy Management, and a chair of the Ninth Symposium on Abstraction, Reformulation and Approximation.

== Bibliography ==
- ——; Nilsson, Nils J. (1987). Logical Foundations of Artificial Intelligence. Morgan Kaufmann. ISBN 978-0-934613-31-6.
- —— (2010). Data Integration: Relational Logic Approach. Synthesis Lectures on Artificial Intelligence and Machine Learning. Vol. 4. Morgan & Claypool. pp. 1–97. doi:10.2200/S00226ED1V01Y200911AIM008. ISBN 978-1-59829-741-6.
- ——; Kao, Eric (2012). Introduction to Logic. Synthesis Lectures on Computer Science. Morgan & Claypool. doi:10.2200/S00734ED2V01Y201609CSL008. ISBN 978-1-62705-006-7.
- ——; Thielscher, Michael (2014). General Game Playing. Synthesis Lectures on Artificial Intelligence and Machine Learning. Morgan & Claypool. doi:10.2200/S00564ED1V01Y201311AIM024. ISBN 978-1-62705-256-6. S2CID 23241902.
- ——; Chaudhri, Vinay (2020). Introduction to Logic Programming. Synthesis Lectures on Artificial Intelligence and Machine Learning. Morgan & Claypool. doi:10.2200/S00966ED1V01Y201911AIM044. ISBN 978-1681737225. S2CID 213262584.

== See also ==
- Game Description Language
- Knowledge Interchange Format
- Logical spreadsheet
- Wumpus world
- Computational law
- General game playing
- Knowledge-based systems
