= Fillet (mechanics) =

Rounding of an interior or exterior corner

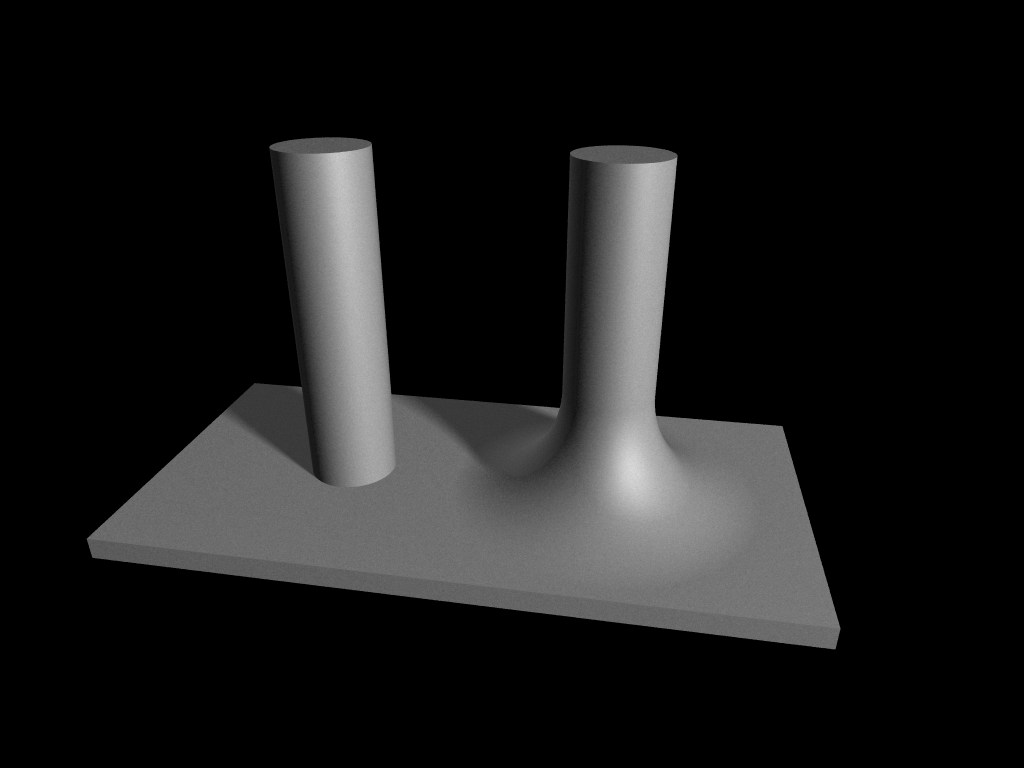
Example of a non-filleted pole (left) and a filleted pole (right)

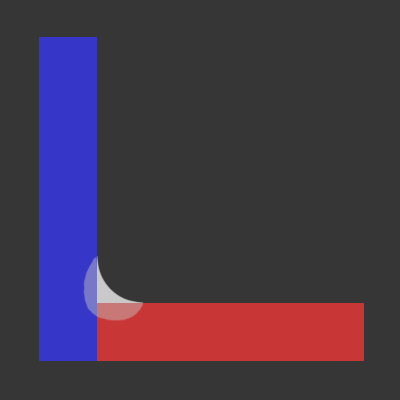
It is common to find a fillet where two parts are welded together

In mechanical engineering, a fillet (/ˈfɪlɪt/ FIL-it) is a rounding of an interior or exterior corner of a part. It contrasts with a chamfer, which is a bevel on a corner. Fillet geometry, when on an interior corner is a line of concave function, whereas a fillet on an exterior corner is a line of convex function (in these cases, fillets are typically referred to as rounds). Fillets commonly appear on welded, soldered, or brazed joints.

Depending on a geometric modelling kernel different CAD software products may provide different fillet functionality. Usually fillets can be quickly designed onto parts using 3D solid modeling engineering by picking edges of interest and invoking the function. Smooth edges connecting two simple flat features are generally simple for a computer to create and fast for a human user to specify. Once these features are included in the CAD design of a part, they are often manufactured automatically using computer-numerical control.

== Applications ==
- Stress concentration is a problem of load-bearing mechanical parts which is reduced by employing fillets on points and lines of expected high stress. The fillets distribute the stress over a broader area and effectively make the parts more durable and capable of bearing larger loads.
- For considerations in aerodynamics, fillets are employed to reduce interference drag where aircraft components such as wings, struts, and other surfaces meet one another.
- For manufacturing, concave corners are sometimes filleted to allow the use of round-tipped end mills to cut out an area of a material. This has a cycle time benefit if the round mill is simultaneously being used to mill complex curved surfaces.
- Radii are used to eliminate sharp edges that can be easily damaged or that can cause injury when the part is handled.

== Terminology ==
Terminology for rounding on a mechanical part

Different design packages use different names for the same operations.

- Autodesk Inventor, AutoCAD, Rhino3D, CATIA, FreeCAD, Solidworks and Vectorworks refer to both concave and convex rounded edges as fillets, while referring to angled cuts of edges and concave corners as chamfers.
- CADKEY and Unigraphics refer to concave and convex rounded edges as blends.
- PTC Creo Elements/Pro (formerly Pro/Engineer) refers to rounded edges simply as rounds.

Other 3D solid modeling software programs outside of engineering, such as gameSpace, have similar functions.

== See also ==
- Welding
