= Pro/DESKTOP =

Computer-aided design program

- Original author(s): Parametric Technology Corporation
- Developer(s): David Taylor, Parametric Technology Corporation
- Written in: C++, Granite
- Operating system: Windows
- Platform: PC
- Available in: multilingual
- Type: Computer-aided design tool
- Website: ptc.com

Pro/DESKTOP (commonly referred to as Pro/D and formerly known as DesignWave) is a discontinued computer-aided design (CAD) program from Parametric Technology Corporation (PTC), that allowed users to design and model in 3D and create 2D drawings. It can transfer a 3D design into a 2D engineering drawing format and also create photo-realistic views using Album Views. It is part-compatible with Pro/ENGINEER, and uses the Granite kernel, but otherwise is a freestanding CAD system.

Initially written by David Taylor in Cambridge, England, the original software is registered to Cyril Slug of the fictitious company Bimorcad Ltd. Dialog box 356 shows a picture of the author, wearing a red and black checked jacket sat on a wall, drinking a cup of tea outside his house.

The software was built using Microsoft Visual C++ (Microsoft Foundation Class 4.X) and also software modules from D-Cubed to implement geometric constraint solution as well as parametric sketching and other part features required for file support with Pro/Engineer. The Pro/DESKTOP interface was available in English, French, German, Chinese (simplified and traditional) and Japanese.

== Areas ==
=== Drawing view ===
Drawing View of a Coffee Table Designed in Pro/DESKTOPการออกแบบสไตน์นี้เรียกว่าอะไร มีใครพอจะรู้บ้าง

This area allows the user to generate technical drawings from their design. The drawing view supports a number of industry standards including:

- AFNOR
- ANSI (Inch)
- ANSI (mm)
- BS308
- DIN
- ISO
- JIS

This view allows full linear, radial and angular dimensioning of designs and also supports part lists for assemblies of 2 or more components.

=== Album views ===
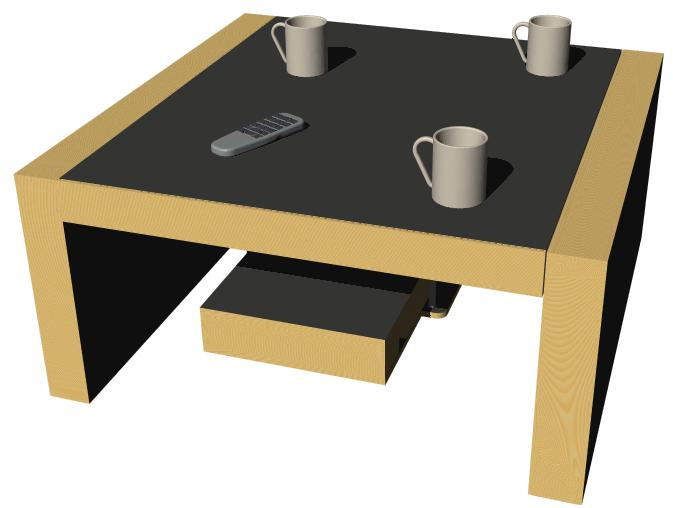
Album View Of a Coffee Table Designed in Pro/DESKTOP

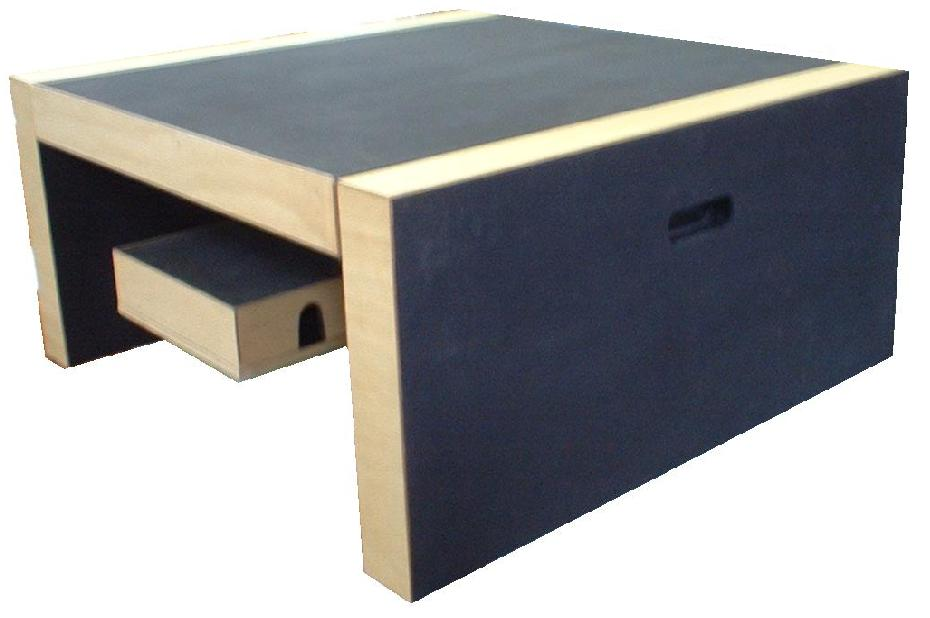
Photograph of the coffee table shown above

This area allows the user to create photo-realistic view of their design. There is an array of different options available to alter this view. Options available are:

- A large library of different materials (sometimes called textures, with the option to add more, which can be applied to whole components or individual faces).
- A choice of five different lighting options (Default, Room Lighting, Day Lighting, Flood Lighting and Spot Lighting)
- A choice of eight different camera lenses; these digitally alter the view to give the illusions of the chosen camera lens. These are:

- Fisheye, 16 mm
- Ultra Wideangle, 20mm
- Wideangle, 28 mm
- Moderate Wideangle, 35 mm
- Standard, 50mm
- Moderate Telephoto, 70mm
- Telephoto, 110mm
- Reflex, 1000000mm

== System requirements ==
Computer

- Intel x86 or compatible (e.g. Pentium 166Mhz) microprocessor
- 64Mb of Random access memory

Display

- 16-bit colour graphics capability (65,535 colours)
- Recommended but not required:
- Size 1024 x 768 pixels
- 70 Hz refresh rate non interlaced
- 17-inch monitor for optimal use
- OpenGL hardware support recommended for optimal performance

Hard disk

- 40 Mb (2001i)
- 80 Mb (8.0)

== Variants ==
There were multiple versions of the software release:

- 2001i
- 2001i Express
- 8.0
- 8.0 Express

The Express versions did not support some features of the full software such as the use of bitmaps for rendering images. Threads were represented as cosmetics rather than geometry on the part. This limited use with say STL exports as the resultant exported surface in the data would be a smooth rod rather than a thread form. The 2008 Express release also removed support for Visual Basic for Applications (VBA) available in the 2001i version. The resolution of STL exports was also limited in the Express versions e.g. external diameters limited to 0.1° resolution in the export dialog box.

== Licensing ==
License keys were required, for the Express variants which were obtained from the PTC website without charge. The returned keys (8 groups of 4 numeric digits) had expiry dates encoded to prevent use of the software after a certain date. The key obtained was based on data from the computer, which limited use of the key to the computer generating the license request. The key was based on the computers hard disk's Volume Serial Number (8 characters) and additional data about the computer (5 bytes). The number was passed to the web server in an obfuscated by alphabetic shift re-arrangement technique in order to make decoding of the transferred data more difficult. e.g. a Hard disk Volume ID of 0000-0000 would be encoded as petssssssssscs where the s is equal to the 0.

=== Educational licensing ===
Pro/DESKTOP had particularly distinguished itself in the education market. From a start in the CAD/CAM in Schools Initiative in the UK, Pro/DESKTOP has been donated free of charge to over 14,000 secondary schools worldwide, and is used by nearly 4 million students each school year. Its main educational rival was AutoCAD, which is widely used in secondary schools to teach 2D drafting and technical drawing. The use of Pro/DESKTOP in schools for 3D design has far exceeded AutoCad as it is generally considered too technical for the education market. Its minimal system requirements further cement the software as the program of choice for those just starting out in CAD. However, Pro/DESKTOP's user interface provides difficulty due to the lack of a multiple string undo function and the program's grouping of entities into work-planes that must have the same characteristics.

Pro/DESKTOP is no longer available for download or activation, but PTC instead now offers up to 300 seats of Pro/ENGINEER Schools Edition to high schools free of charge.

In 2012 PTC continued its support of schools by making its latest Creo 3D Modelling software available free to schools. Creo represents a major update of Pro|ENGINEER with ribbon style menus, streamlined workflows and the addition of several major new features including; direct modelling, flexible modelling and freestyle Sub Division surfacing tools. The use of a common data model supports seamless movement between the different modelling tools with no loss of data. PTC Schools Programme.

== See also ==
- Parametric Technology Corporation
- Creo
- Pro/ENGINEER
- Creo Elements/View
