= Creo Elements/View =

Suite of digital mockup and product visualization software applications

- Developer(s): PTC
- Initial release: 1997
- Stable release: 9.1 / December 5, 2008; 16 years ago
- Operating system: Windows, Unix
- Type: 3D graphics software
- License: Proprietary
- Website: ptc.com/products/creo-elements-view

Creo Elements/View, formerly known as ProductView, is a suite of digital mockup and product visualization software applications from PTC.

== History ==
ProductView, now Creo Elements/View, was originally developed by Object Logic, a small company in San Diego. In September 1998, Division Group, another vendor of visualization tools based in Bristol UK, announced the planned acquisition of ObjectLogic. However, before this acquisition could be completed, PTC acquired Division Group in January 1999 for approximately $48 million in stock and cash. PTC then completed the acquisition of Object Logic in March, 1999.

PTC then marketed products from both companies using the names ProductView and DIVISION.

In 2008, PTC changed its definition of ProductView to define the suite of products acquired from Object Logic and Division Group as well as products acquired in the purchase of OHIO Design Automation.

As of 2008, the latest release is version 9.1.

On October 28, 2010, PTC announced that ProductView is now Creo Elements/View. The name change applies to release 9.1.

== ProductView components ==
=== Mechanical CAD (MCAD) Visualization ===
Creo Elements/View MCAD Professional (formally called ProductView Standard) – This is PTC’s primary product visualization tool

Creo Elements/View Lite – A subset of ProductView MCAD professional capabilities that is included with Windchill

ProductView Composer 9.0 – Creates interactive assembly and dis-assembly sequences

Creo Elements/View PDF Collaboration – Manages document collaboration including annotation, viewing and watermarking.

ProductView Realizer 9.0 – Creates interactive animations of mechanisms

Creo Elements/View Toolkits – Used to create custom applications based on the ProductView technology

Creo Elements/View Express – Free, downloadable tool for simple viewing of Creo Elements/Pro (formerly Pro/ENGINEER) parts, assemblies and drawings

DIVISION MockUp – PTC’s primary digital mockup tool

DIVISION Reality – This tool builds upon DIVISION Mockup to create a higher-end virtual environment that is used to analyze product models

=== Electrical CAD (ECAD) Visualization ===
Creo Elements/View ECAD Compare (formerly called InterComm EDAcompare) – Compare two versions of printed circuit board (PCB) designs

Creo Elements/View Validate (formerly called validation manager, a part of InterComm EDAcompare)– Steps through changes made between ECAD designs or across ECAD and MCAD design

InterComm EDAconduit – Automates electronic markup exchange between ECAD authors and non-authors

InterComm Expert– Verifies electronic design intent with multiple departments

== See also ==
- Parametric Technology Corporation
- Creo
- Creo Elements/Pro
- Pro/DESKTOP
