= Richard Fateman =

American computer scientist (born 1946)

Richard J Fateman
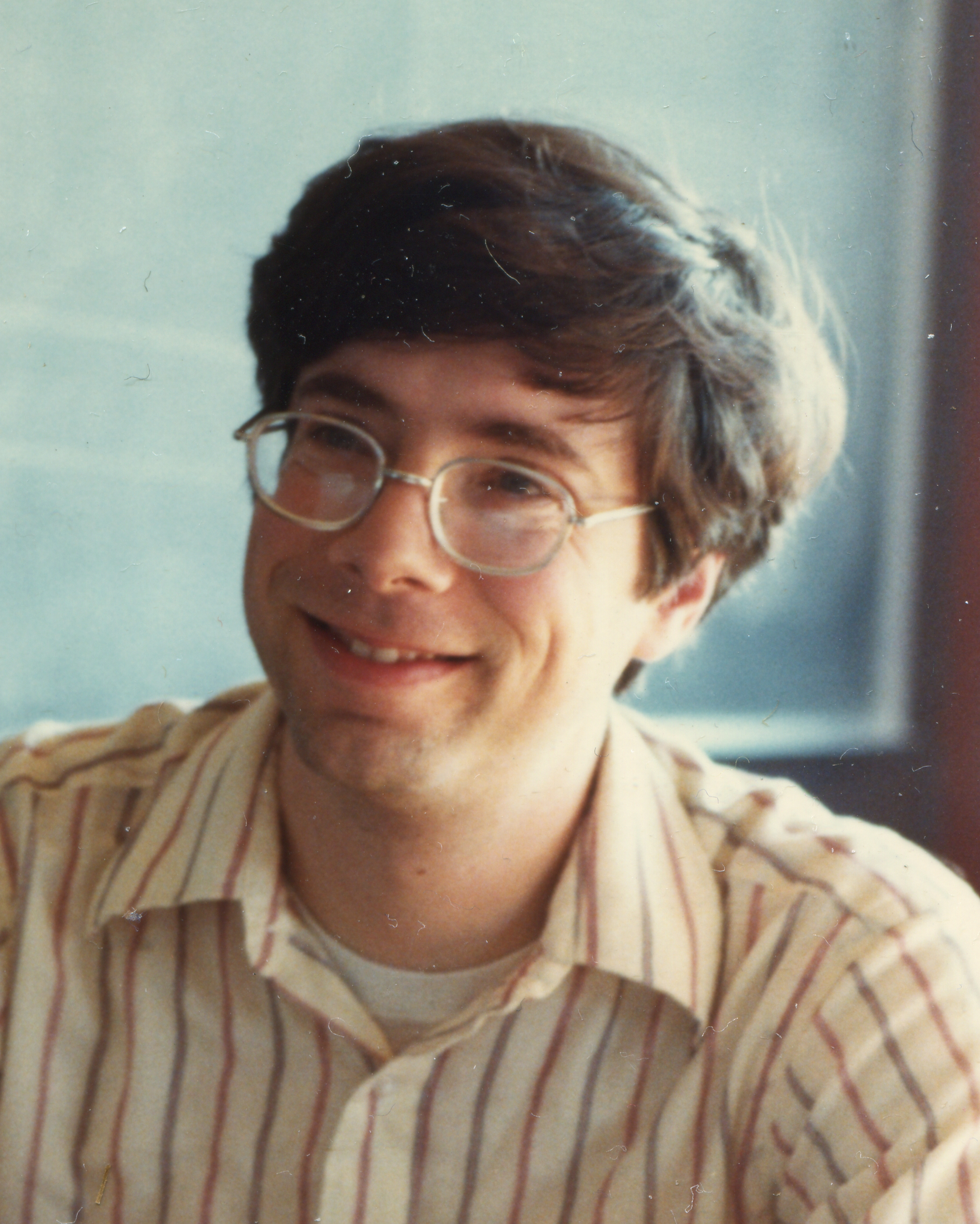
- Born: November 4, 1946 (age 79)
- Education: B.S. (1966), Union College; Ph.D. (1971), Harvard University
- Occupation: Computer scientist
- Employer: University of California, Berkeley
- Known for: Macsyma, Franz Lisp
- Spouse: Martha Fateman
- Children: Abigail Fateman; Johanna Fateman
- Call sign: KJ6BIH
- Scientific career
- Thesis: Essays in Algebraic Simplification (1971)
- Doctoral advisor: Joel Moses; Anthony Oettinger

Richard J Fateman (born November 4, 1946) is a professor emeritus of computer science at the University of California, Berkeley.

He received a BS in Physics and Mathematics from Union College in June, 1966, and a Ph.D. in Applied Mathematics from Harvard University in June, 1971. He was a major contributor to the Macsyma computer algebra system at MIT and later to the Franz Lisp system. His current interests include scientific programming environments; computer algebra systems; distributed computing; analysis of algorithms; programming and measurement of large systems; design and implementation of programming languages; and optical character recognition. In 1999, he was inducted as a Fellow of the Association for Computing Machinery.

Richard Fateman is the father of musician Johanna Fateman.
