= Kodak Ektaprint Electronic Publishing System =

The Kodak Ektaprint Electronic Publishing System (KEEPS) was a professional electronic publishing system sold internationally by the Eastman Kodak Company from 1987–1992. KEEPS was a fully integrated turnkey system, consisting of publishing software from Interleaf, computer hardware from Sun Microsystems, customized front-end software developed by Kodak that ran on Unix System V Release 4, and Kodak's high-end scanners (which were designed in-house) and Ektaprint printers and copiers (which were actually Heidelberg-engined machines).

KEEPS was capable of producing WYSIWYG ("what you see is what you get") output at near-typeset quality, while also offering document management and workflow tools for collaborative environments.

Marketing materials from Kodak distinguished KEEPs from Desktop Publishing by describing the product as Professional Electronic Publishing.

KEEPS became the preferred document publishing system from 1989–1990 amongst governments and large corporations.

== History ==
During its inception in the early 1980s, Eastman Kodak Company put together a specialized division to sell and maintain KEEPS. Kodak bought the rights to the Atek Publishing System in the early 1980s. At the time of acquisition, Atek was the leading publishing software product for newspapers and magazines.

Kodak established contracts with Sun Microsystems which allowed it to sell workstation and server equipment for less money than Sun itself could sell it for. The arrangement was made possible by Kodak agreeing to provide installation, service and support of the hardware themselves.

In the early stages of KEEPS's product life cycle, Kodak had a significant advantage in making sales to the federal government which (at that time) preferred doing business with older established companies—especially since Kodak already had a substantial presence in government with its copiers, film, and other technology, and could leverage government contacts and contracts into new business.

At first, Kodak hired representatives (both sales/marketing and technicians) who had extensive knowledge of the publishing industry, and promised them competitive salaries.

KEEPS's popularity peaked in 1990, prior to the release of the Quark Publishing System, Arbortext, and Framemaker and during the infancies of Xerox Ventura Publisher and Aldus PageMaker.

Later, Kodak reneged on the salary promises they made, and slowly began losing division staff to competitors offering better salaries, including Interleaf, Frame Technology Corp, Arbortext, etc.

Kodak renamed its KEEPS publishing and copier line to Lionheart. By then, the division lost most of the people who really understood the product and the publishing industry. Lionheart was discontinued after Interleaf announced a new version of their product (Interleaf 5) which would run on PCs. In 1991, Quark released a viable product suitable for collaborative environments, and Ventura Publisher and Pagemaker became serious competitors.
