= Wind chill (disambiguation) =

Wind chill is a meteorological effect.

Windchill may refer to:

- Wind Chill (film), 2007 horror film
- Windchill (software), PLM application
- Windchill (G.I. Joe), a fictional character in the G.I. Joe universe
