= Russell Greiner =

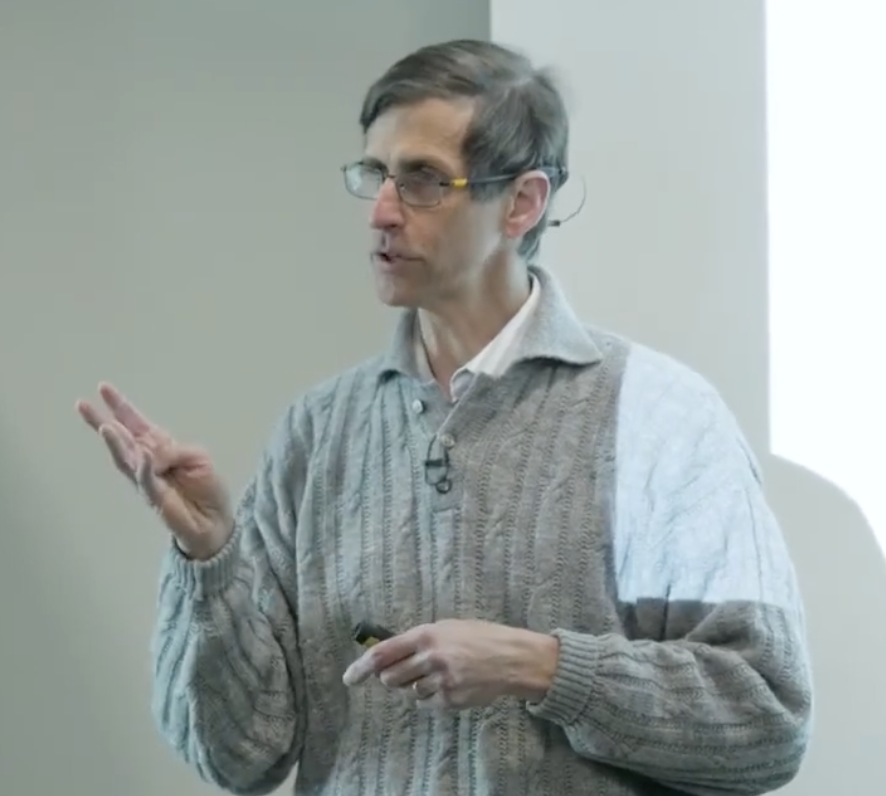
- Greiner during a lecture in 2017.
- Education: California Institute of Technology (BSc); Stanford University (MSc, PhD)
- Awards: AAAI Fellow; CAIAC Lifetime Achievement Award (2021); Canada CIFAR AI Chair (2021); Precision Health Innovator Award (2022); CS-Can / Info-Can Lifetime Achievement Award (2023); Brockhouse Prize (2024)
- Scientific career
- Fields: Machine learning, Medical informatics, Bioinformatics
- Workplaces: University of Alberta
- Doctoral advisor: Michael Genesereth

Russell Greiner is a Canadian computer scientist and professor of computing science at the University of Alberta. He is also an adjunct professor in psychiatry at the University of Alberta, a fellow of the Association for the Advancement of Artificial Intelligence, and a Canada CIFAR AI Chair.

After earning a PhD from Stanford University, Greiner worked in both academic and industrial research before joining the University of Alberta, where he became professor of computing science and adjunct professor in psychiatry. He was also a founding scientific director of the Alberta Machine Intelligence Institute.

Greiner served as program chair of the International Conference on Machine Learning in 2004 and conference chair in 2006.

He was elected a fellow of the AAAI in 2007. He received a McCalla Professorship and a Killam Annual Professorship at the University of Alberta. In 2021, he received the CAIAC Lifetime Achievement Award and was named a Canada CIFAR AI Chair. In 2022, he received the University of Alberta Precision Health Innovator Award. In 2023, he received the CS-Can / Info-Can Lifetime Achievement Award. In 2024, Greiner shared the Brockhouse Prize with David Wishart for work on machine learning for metabolomics.

For his mentoring, Greiner received the University of Alberta Great Supervisor Award in 2020 and the Killam Award for Excellence in Mentoring in 2023.

His research has focused on machine learning, bioinformatics, medical informatics, survival prediction, and the formal foundations of learnability.
