= KeyCreator =

Software

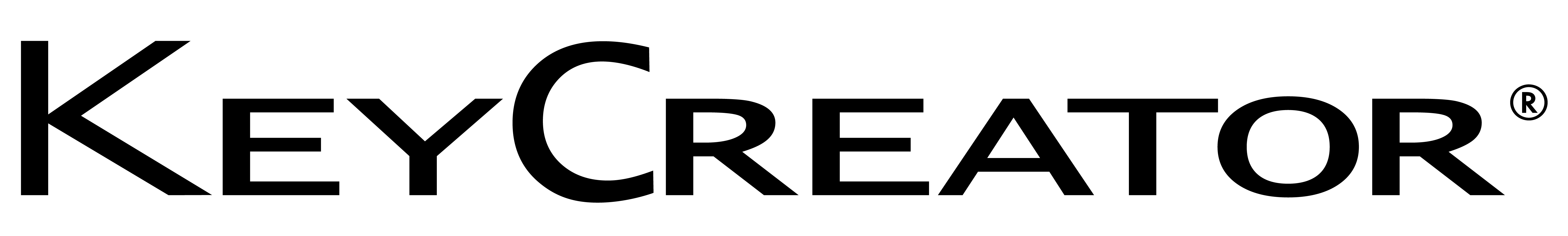
- Developer: Kubotek Kosmos
- Initial release: 2004
- Stable release: 2024 / October 26, 2023
- Operating system: Windows
- Predecessor: CADKEY
- Type: Computer-aided design
- License: Commercial proprietary software
- Website: www.kubotekkosmos.com/meet-keycreator.aspx

KeyCreator is a commercial software application for 2D and 3D computer-aided design (CAD) and drafting available since 2004.

== History ==
KeyCreator is a non-parametric, non-history based, "direct" 2D/3D solid modeling CAD program. Originally known as CADKEY, it was first released in 1984 for MS-DOS and UNIX, then later for Windows. It was among the first CAD programs with 3D capabilities for personal computers. Besides solid modeling, KeyCreator is also capable of wire-frame and surface modeling, as well as drafting.

== Design ==
=== File formats and versions ===
KeyCreator’s native file format is .ckd.

=== Languages ===
KeyCreator is available for English, German, French, Italian, Spanish, Japanese, and Brazilian Portuguese.

=== Extensions ===
KeyCreator is capable of translating and editing the following file formats from other CAD software:

- AutoCAD .dwg, .dxf
- Autodesk Inventor .ipt, .iam
- CADKEY .prt
- Catia .mod, .model, .catproduct, .catpart
- SolidWorks .sldprt, .sldasm
- Pro/Engineer .prt, .asm
- PTC Creo .prt
- Siemens NX .prt
- Unigraphics .prt
- Neutral formats such as STEP .stp, IGES .igs, Parasolid .x_t, and ACIS .sat
- Stereolithography (for 3D printing) .stl

=== Add-On Software ===
KeyCreator has several additional software options for varying functions.

- XMD - Expert Mold Designer provides intelligent automation, custom plate stack layouts, and part revision management. XMD includes tens of thousands of standard components designers need for mold, die, fixture, and machine design.
- KeyCreator Machinist is a 2 and 3 axis CAM solution for Mold, die & tooling, wood working, rapid prototyping and general machining.
- KeyCreator Artisan allows 3D models to be turned into photorealistic renderings.
- KeyCreator CKD Viewer is a no-cost program for reviewing 3D models and drawings stored in CKD files.

== Designed with KeyCreator ==
Aero Tec Laboratories used KeyCreator to design crash resistant, nonexploding fuel-bladder tanks for aircraft, race cars, and performance boats. They have made custom bladder tanks for NASCAR, Ferrari, Boeing, Lockheed, NASA and the U.S. Military.

== See also ==
- CADKEY
