= DataCAD =

Architectural design software

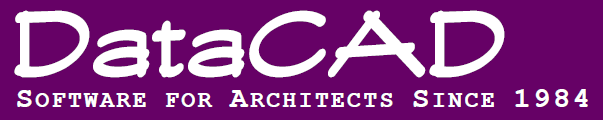
- Developers: Microtecture Inc., Cadkey Inc., DATACAD LLC
- Release: November 1984
- Stable release: DataCAD 23 / November 2023
- Written in: Delphi Pascal, C/C++
- Operating system: Microsoft Windows
- Type: 3D computer graphics, CAD
- License: Proprietary
- Website: datacad.com

DataCAD is a computer-aided design and drafting (CADD) software for 2D and 3D architectural design and drafting, developed and sold by DATACAD LLC.

== Usage ==
DataCAD runs exclusively on Microsoft Windows-based operating systems, and was one of the first PC-based CADD programs developed specifically for architects. DataCAD is the only CADD software ever to be endorsed by the American Institute of Architects (ca. 1987) for direct distribution to its members. By 1988, DataCAD was in use by more than 12,000 firms in the United States and Canada. Currently, there are estimated to be more than 250,000 installations of DataCAD worldwide.

According to The 1989 AIA Firm Survey Report, DataCAD is used by 10% of AIA member firms, second only to AutoCAD with a 45% market share.

According to The 1997 AIA Firm Survey Report, DataCAD is used by 12% of AIA member firms, second only to AutoCAD with a 61% market share.

== History ==
In the Spring of 1981, a student, Eric V. Smith, began developing a program he called Apple Draw on an Apple II at University of Virginia. After he graduated in 1984, Mr. Smith was hired by an architectural firm, Stuart Griffin Burgh and Associates, in Charlottesville, Virginia. At this firm he began porting the Apple Draw program to the Corvus Concept platform as DataCAD. In 1984, only one license of DataCAD was sold before it was ported to the IBM PC platform. DataCAD was developed exclusively for the MS-DOS operating system until May 1998.

The DataCAD Boston Users' Group (DBUG) was formed in December 1987 by two architects, the late Evan Shu, FAIA (1953 - 2020) and Rick Gleason, AIA. In November 2020, DBUG reached a 33-year milestone and stands as one of the longest, continuously running, CAD software users' groups in the United States. DBUG is a permanent committee of the Boston Society of Architects.

In June 1989, Cadkey, Inc. (the original developer of CADKEY), purchased the rights to DataCAD from Microtecture Inc.

In September 1992, Dr. Malcolm Davies was elected President/CEO of Cadkey, Inc. Dr. Davies joined Cadkey from Autodesk where from 1988 to 1992 he was V.P. Marketing and Sales.

In November 1993, the price of DataCAD was drastically reduced from $2,995 to $150 coincident with a major shift from dealer-based sales to direct mail-based sales.

In October 1994, the first online forum (also known as The DBUG Forum) dedicated to DataCAD users was established by the late Evan Shu, FAIA (1953 - 2020). The DBUG Forum is a listserv supported by subscribers worldwide. A searchable archive of more than 70,000 messages is available (see External links).

On October 2, 1996, a newly formed company, DATACAD LLC, co-founded by Mark F. Madura, the late David A. Giesselman (1957 - 2020), and H. William Mirbach, purchased the rights to DataCAD from Micro Control Systems, Inc. (formerly Cadkey, Inc.).

In February 1998, DATACAD, along with 14 other companies, joined the newly formed, OpenDWG Alliance (now Open Design Alliance) as a founding member. The alliance is dedicated to the promotion of Autodesk's DWG drawing file format as an open industry standard for the exchange of CADD drawings.

A lower-cost version, DataCAD LT (pronounced "el-tee"), was first introduced in 2001.

On October 2, 2020, Mark F. Madura reached a 24-year milestone as president and CEO of DATACAD LLC.

On April 2, 2019, Principal DataCAD Author, the late David A. Giesselman (1957 - 2020), Senior V.P. and C.T.O. of DATACAD LLC reached a 35-year milestone as a DataCAD software engineer.

=== Version history ===
- DataCAD 22 - September 2020
- DataCAD 21 - February 2019
- DataCAD 20 - January 2018
- DataCAD 19 - October 2016
- DataCAD 18 - October 2015
- DataCAD 17 - October 2014
- DataCAD 16 - October 2013
- DataCAD 15 - October 2012
- DataCAD 14 - September 2011
- DataCAD 13 - June 2010
- DataCAD 12 - June 2007
- DataCAD 11 - November 2003
- DataCAD 10 - October 2001
- DataCAD 9 - August 2000
- DataCAD 8.5 - July 1999
- DataCAD 8 - May 1998 (First Windows version)
- DataCAD 7.5 - August 1997
- DataCAD 7 - November 1995
- DataCAD 6 - November 1994
- DataCAD 5 - October 1993
- DataCAD 4 - August 1990
- DataCAD 3.6 - May 1988
- DataCAD 3 - October 1986
- DataCAD 2.5 - October 1985
- DataCAD 2 - June 1985
- DataCAD 1.2 - April 1985 (First IBM PC version)
- Archon - 1982 - 1985 (Unreleased, runs on Corvus Constellation)

== See also ==
- Comparison of computer-aided design software
