= Wumpus world =

Wumpus world is a simple world use in artificial intelligence for which to represent knowledge and to reason. Wumpus world was introduced by Michael Genesereth, and is discussed in the Russell-Norvig Artificial Intelligence book Artificial Intelligence: A Modern Approach. Wumpus World is loosely inspired by the 1972 video game Hunt the Wumpus.

== Problem description ==
In Artificial Intelligence: A Modern Approach, the wumpus world features a 4x4 grid, containing a monster called a wumpus, multiple bottomless pits and hidden gold. The agent starts at (1,1) and has to find the gold and return to the starting position. The agent loses 1 point for every move and gains 1000 points for bringing the gold to the starting position. The agent can sense pits by a breeze, stench indicates a wumpus, and sparkle indicates gold. The wumpus can be killed by an arrow but costs 10 points.
