= Paul S. Wang =

Chinese-American computer scientist (born 1944)

Paul S. Wang (王 士 弘)
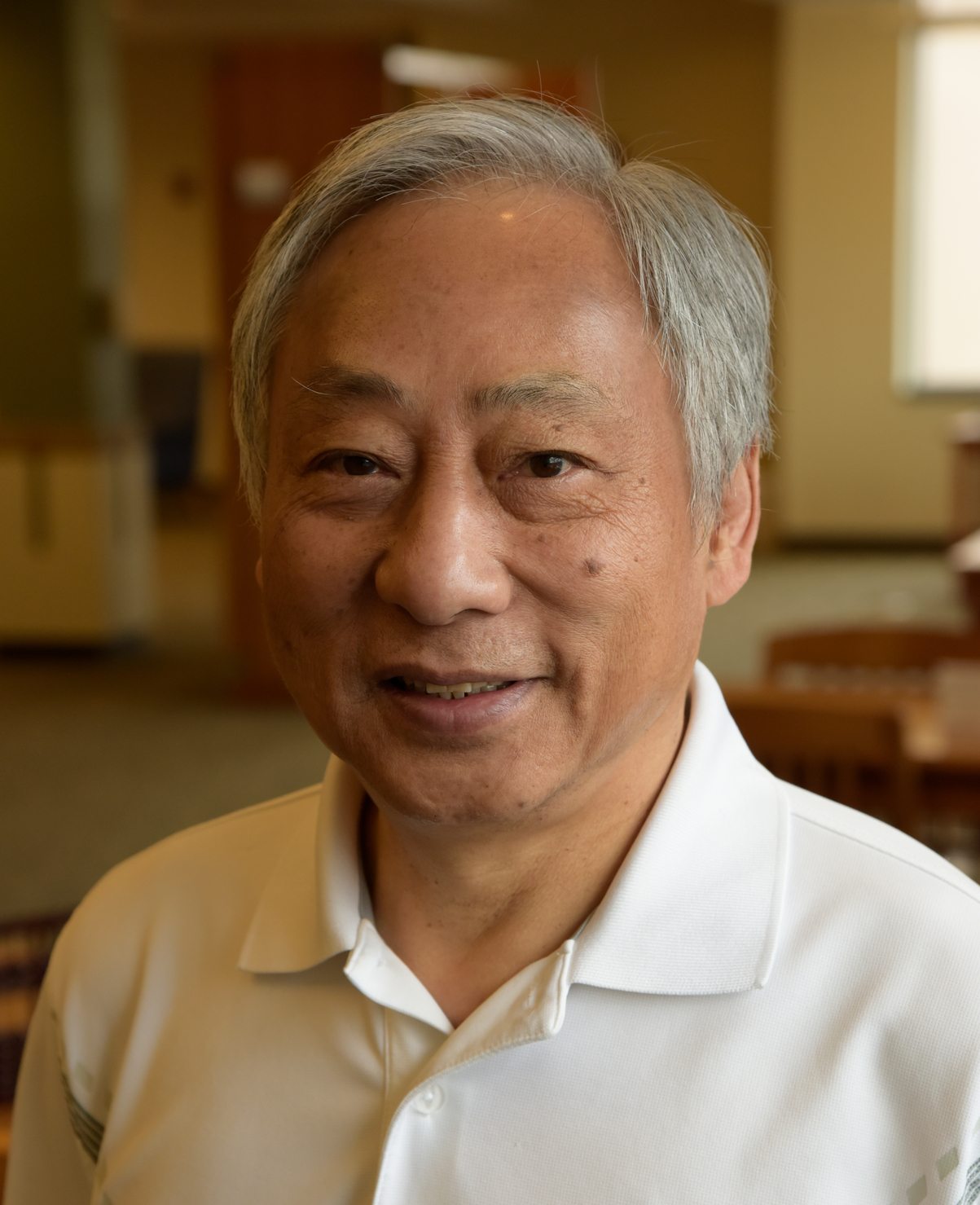
- Born: 1944 (age 81–82); Xi'an, China
- Occupations: Computer scientist, consultant, researcher, author and academic
- Awards: Ohio Governor's Award for University Faculty Entrepreneurship, Ohio Arts Council

Academic background
- Education: B.S. degree Ph.D. degree
- Alma mater: Taipei Female Normal University Elementary School (台北女師附小); Taiwan Normal University High School (台北師大附中); Taiwan National Zhongxing University (Department of Applied Mathematics, 中興大學應用數學系); Massachusetts Institute of Technology
- Thesis: Evaluation of Definite Integrals by Symbolic Manipulation (1971)

Academic work
- Institutions: Massachusetts Institute of Technology, IBM Thomas J. Watson Research Center, Kent State University, HP Labs, Sandia National Laboratories

Paul S. Wang is a Chinese-American computer scientist, researcher, author, consultant, and academic. He is Professor Emeritus of Computer Science at Kent State University.

Wang's expertise lies in automation of mathematical computation. He has conducted over forty research projects. His research mainly focuses on Symbolic and Algebraic Computation (SAC), automatic code generation, Internet Accessible Mathematical Computation (IAMC), polynomial factoring and GCD algorithms, enabling technologies and classroom delivery of Web-based Mathematics Education (WME), and parallel and distributed SAC. He has also authored several books of Computer Science including Mastering Modern Linux, From Computing to Computational Thinking, An Introduction to Web Design and Programming, Mastering Linux, An Introduction to Web Design and Programming, and Standard C++ with Object-Oriented Programming.

Wang also writes articles for his blog on Computational Thinking (CT).

== Early life and education ==
Wang was born in Xi'an, China in 1944. He graduated from Taiwan National Zhongxing University in 1967 and then immigrated to the United States on receiving a graduate scholarship to attend Massachusetts Institute of Technology. In 1971, he earned a Doctoral degree in computer science from MIT. His doctoral thesis, supervised by Joel Moses, is entitled "Evaluation of Definite Integrals by Symbolic Manipulation".

== Career ==
Following his Doctoral degree he became faculty at MIT (1971–1977). Wang joined Kent State University in 1977 and began to establish the computer (CS) subject in the Department of Mathematical Sciences. In 1981, he held an appointment as Computer Science professor, and then served as Director at the Institute for Computational Mathematics from 1986 till 2011. He retired in 2012 and became Professor Emeritus at Kent State University.

In 1980s, he established sofpower, a consultancy in the field of information technology. In 2001, he established webtong.com. He taught Web design and programming for more than ten years. During this time period, he published two textbooks entitled An Introduction to Web Design and Programming and Dynamic Web Programming and HTML5 in 2003 and 2012. In 2015, he published From Computing to Computational Thinking.

Since 2017, Wang has been writing articles on his own blog computational thinking (CT).

== Research ==
As a young graduate student Wang joined Project MAC, the research lab that led to the MIT LCS (Laboratory for Computer Science) which later became the CSAIL at MIT. Wang began to work on automation of mathematical computation under the Macsyma project. His research primarily focuses on Symbolic and Algebraic Computation (SAC also known as Computer Algebra), Internet Accessible Mathematical Computation (IAMC), polynomial factoring and GCD algorithms, enabling technologies for and classroom delivery of Web-based Mathematics Education (WME), automatic code generation, and parallel and distributed SAC.

=== Polynomial factorization ===
Wang is known for his work on factorization of polynomials. He developed and published mathematical theories and new algorithms for GCD and factoring of univariate and multivariate polynomials, over the integers and algebraic extensions. These algorithms have been implemented in Macsyma and later in MAXIMA symbolic manipulation systems. The collection of algorithms combine to form a complete system that solved the polynomial factorization problem in practice.

The central breakthrough in Wang's polynomial factoring algorithms lies in p-adic lifting (Hensel's lemma). Namely, first reducing factoring a multivariate polynomial to a corresponding univariate factoring problem. The one-variable problem is further reduced to a mod-p problem. The mod-p factors are then lifted up to a solution over the integers which can then be lifted to recover the multivariate factors, one additional variable at a time. This idea and other ingenious methods, such as leading coefficient determination, combine to make Wang's polynomial factoring algorithms powerful and practical.

The introduction of Wang's algorithms ended the lack of effective polynomial factoring methods. The collection of algorithms, as implemented in MAXIMA, remains the best available in general.

=== Object-oriented programming ===
Wang authored a book in 1999 in which he discussed basic and advanced procedures for the coverage of Java programming. He introduced multithreading, object-oriented programming (OOP), graphical user interfaces, event-driven programming, and networking. He proposed applications for the development of Java applets and programs. He studied the importance of C++ in terms of bridging real world applications and addressing basic concepts of object-oriented programming. He further examined attributes of C++ in an organized, simple and concise manner.

In his work regarding HTML5, Wang studied HTML5 markup language and DOM, structuring of Web documents and forms, and important JavaScript APIs related to HTML5. He explored XML and PHP/MySQL, and also proposed page templates, user login, database access, session control, and form processing.

=== Computational thinking ===
While working on Computational Thinking (CT), Wang suggested several tools for understanding and using CT, and explained concepts and methods for CT. His textbook From Computing to Computational Thinking contains games, and everyday examples as preliminary points for discussion and for developing connection between abstract thinking patterns and real-life situations. A Chinese version of the textbook, 从计算到计算思维, has been published for higher education in China.

Wang started a CT blog in 2017 with regular posts on many interesting and useful topics to promote computational thinking and to provide examples of CT applications in many areas including daily living.

=== Website development ===
In his research regarding website development, he explored design and technology aspects of website development, including artistic design, information architecture, computer science, visual communication, and programming. He also studied art and technology of Web site development, and emphasized developmental procedures for the subject. His approaches are based on standard Web protocols and technologies including HTML5, CSS3, JavaScript, DOM, PHP, MySQL, Apache, MathML, SVG, XML, AJAX, and HTTPS. His work also includes IAMC (Internet Accessible Mathematical Computation) and WME (Web-based Mathematics Education) to bring mathematics to the digital age.

=== Operating systems ===
In his book published in 1988, he has given an introduction to the operating system Berkeley Unix. He also focused on Linux and explored various concepts, programming and usage of Linux along with practical examples. He provided user interfaces, Bash Shell scripting, commands and filters, kernel system calls, the file system, and networking and Internet usage.

== Awards and honors ==
- 2001 – Ohio Governor's Award for University Faculty Entrepreneurship, Ohio Arts Council

== Bibliography ==
- Standard C++ with Object-Oriented Programming (1994) ISBN 9780534196448
- Mastering Linux, An Introduction to Web Design and Programming (2003) ISBN 978-0534395285
- An Introduction to Web Design and Programming (2011) ISBN 9780534395285
- From Computing to Computational Thinking (2017) ISBN 9781482217667
- Mastering Modern Linux (2018) ISBN 9781351211284
- Becoming A Computational Thinker: Success in the Digital Age (2024) ISBN 9781032568980
