= Ludus Coriovalli =

Roman artefact and board game

Ludus Coriovalli (English: Corivallum Game) is a stone artefact with carvings possibly representing a board game played during the time of the Roman Empire. It was discovered at the archaeological site of Coriovallum located in the modern day city of Heerlen in the Netherlands, where it was moved to the Het Romeins Museum. Wear found on the stone possibly evidences the use of game pieces, several of which have been uncovered at the site. While it has been suggested that the stone may not be a board game, but rather something else such as an architectural drawing, a lack of similar examples have discouraged this theory.

With the general game playing software Ludii referencing similar games, researchers used artificial intelligence to play the game using various possible rulesets, following the wear patterns to represent where objects would have moved. According to the study, the most likely gameplay result was a two-player blocking game in which one player uses two pieces on one end of the board, while the other player attempts to block their moves with four pieces on the opposite end; although it is possibly that multiple variations were played. Before this, the earliest known example of a blocking game appeared during the medieval period. Based off this, it is possible that they originated centuries earlier.
