= CADKEY =

- A CADKEY (Windows version) user interface showing a wireframe 3D model in multiple viewports.
- Developer(s): Micro Control Systems (AKA CADKEY, Inc.), Baystate Technologies (AKA CADKEY Corporation), Kubotek Corporation
- Initial release: December 1984
- Final release: CADKEY Wireframe Silver Edition / August 4, 2008
- Operating system: Microsoft Windows, DOS, Unix
- Successor: KeyCreator
- Type: 3D computer graphics, CAD
- License: Proprietary
- Website: info.kubotekkosmos.com/cadkey-official

CADKEY is a 2D/3D mechanical CAD (computer aided design or computer aided drafting) software application released for various DOS, Solaris, and Microsoft Windows operating systems. Originally released for DOS in 1984, CADKEY was among the first CAD programs with 3D capabilities for personal computers.

== History ==
Peter Smith and Livingston Davies founded Micro Control Systems (MCS) in 1981. MCS released CADKEY in 1984, the first 3D PC CAD product. After the success of the product the company took the name CADKEY, Inc. and set up headquarters in Windsor, Connecticut. CADKEY won editor's choice and CAD product of the year awards from PC Magazine in 1986 and 1988.

In June 1989, Cadkey, Inc. purchased the rights to DataCAD from Microtecture Inc.

In September 1992, Dr. Malcolm Davies (no relation to Livingston Davies) was elected president/CEO of Cadkey, Inc. Dr. Davies joined Cadkey, Inc. from Autodesk where from 1988 to 1992 he was V.P. marketing and sales. As part of a strategic shift to direct mail-based sales, Malcolm Davies reduced the price of the flagship CADKEY product from US $3,500 to $495.

By 1995, a Microsoft Windows version named CADKEY for Windows was introduced. Around this time CADKEY claimed 240,000 users.

In June 1996, Baystate Technologies of Marlborough, Massachusetts, purchased the rights to the CADKEY product. Previous to the CADKEY acquisition Baystate Technologies had developed third-party software component modules for CADKEY, AutoCAD, Ashlar-Vellum, and Microstation.

By 1999, Baystate Technologies was doing business as CADKEY Corporation, had added significant history-free solid modeling and freeform surface modeling capabilities to the product. A CADKEY variant without any solid or surface modeling capabilities was sold under the name CADKEY Wireframe.

In October 2003 Kubotek Corporation of Osaka, Japan, acquired Baystate Technologies. Kubotek formed Kubotek USA, Inc. based in Marlborough, Massachusetts, and continues development under the name KeyCreator. The first version of KeyCreator was shipped in early 2004.
