= Arbortext Advanced Print Publisher =

Commercial typesetting software

- Developer: Parametric Technology Corporation
- Standards: PostScript, PDF
- Type: Typesetting
- License: Proprietary

Arbortext Advanced Print Publisher (APP, formerly Advent 3B2) is commercial typesetting software application sold by Parametric Technology Corporation.

The software contains an automated publishing engine that can manually or automatically produce Postscript and PDF documents with complex page layouts. Entry level pricing through specialized resellers starts between $4,000 and $10,000 USD. Starting with release 12.0.0.0, APP has been rebranded as Arbortext Layout Developer.

== History ==
- Mid-1980s: Swindon-based company Advent Publishing Systems creates 3B2, a desktop publishing application. 3B2 gained a reputation as a challenger for QuarkXPress, but was soon eclipsed by that product in the DTP world and itself evolved into the high end automation market. The name 3B2 comes from the business park in Swindon (UK) where Advent had its offices at the time.
- Early 2000s: Advent integrates more XML technologies into 3B2, allowing users to associate formatting with XML hierarchies. In 2003 Printing World magazine reported that Springer-Verlag was planning to implement an automated page production process. Dr. Patrick Thibor of Springer was quoted as saying "we believe that 3B2 is the only tool available for automated page make up and will enable us to meet our goal of totally automatic production of pages". As of 2019, Springer Nature (including BMC) was still using it.
- 2004: Advent Publishing Systems is purchased by Arbortext to provide a more powerful alternative to that product's existing FOSI/TeX engine.
- 2005: Arbortext purchased by PTC to provide technical documentation capabilities in its product lifecycle management tools.
- 2009: Integration with the existing Arbortext suite of products released with APP Version 10 and Arbortext 6.0
- 2011: APP Engine becomes default print and PDF engine for all Arbortext products.
- 2011: APP Version 11.0 F000 released.
- 2015: APP Version 11.1 F000 released.
- 2017: APP Version 11.2 F000 released.
- 2019: APP Version 12.0.0.0 released.

== Uses ==
APP has traditionally been used for a number of specific typesetting tasks.

- Scientific, technical and medical journal publishing, particularly in India. APP's automation, SGML/XML handling and mathematics formatting mean this complex layout task can be automated
- Financial typesetting, particularly generation of EDGAR reports for Securities and Exchange Commission filings
- Government reports such as Hansard, daily journals and other reports.

== Technologies ==
APP supports processing of marked-up text such as SGML, XML and HTML natively, using a JavaScript based Formatting Object Model API and/or its own proprietary scripting languages and established technologies such as Perl, XPath and Unicode. Its rules-based engine allows the stylesheet builder to automate demanding page make-up tasks and run them in a 'lights out' server mode.

APP applies text and page formatting properties with any chevron delimited mark-up such as SGML or XML or non well formed markup. APP 'templates' are stylesheets that comprise page layouts, text formatting styles and scripting.

Scripting is used to automate and apply conditions to the publishing process. Traditionally this was done using 'macros', which are low-level system commands. In later versions a JavaScript FOM API was introduced which can be used as automation scripting and powerful inline conditional processing. When using XML, a template can employ XPath or match-statement contexts to specify the exact conditions to which style is applied through the parser. Such conditions can also be configured for SGML and other tagged data using proprietary tools called showstrings.

Principal outputs are PostScript and PDF, although APP also provides a number of alternative output drivers. APP provides a WYSIWYG view of pages in the Desktop version, which can be used to manipulate pages after automated composition, or to build templates.
