= Mathsoft =

American mathematical software company, 1984–2006

MathSoft, Inc.
- Industry: Software
- Founded: 1984; 42 years ago
- Founder: Allen Razdow; David Blohm
- Defunct: April 2006; 20 years ago
- Fate: Acquired by Parametric Technology Corporation
- Headquarters: Cambridge, Massachusetts
- Products: Mathcad
- Website: www.mathsoft.com

MathSoft, Inc. was a software company founded in 1984 by Allen Razdow and David Blohm in Cambridge, Massachusetts, providing mathematical software to students, engineers and professionals. The company is best known for Mathcad, a technical calculation application that allowed engineers to write equations in a natural mathematical notation and link them directly to computed results and graphs.

== History ==
MathSoft was founded in 1984, developing Mathcad as its flagship product alongside StudyWorks, a series of interactive maths and science education packages for middle school and high school students.

In 2001, MathSoft restructured, selling its Engineering & Education Products Division to the division's own management team as a privately held company, renamed MathSoft Engineering and Education, Inc. MathSoft Inc. itself, retaining the statistical software business, was shut down its FreeScholarships.com division and renamed itself Insightful Corporation, which went on to develop the S-Plus statistical analysis platform and the StatServer data analysis package.

MathSoft Engineering and Education continued to develop and sell Mathcad and the Mathcad Calculation Server, an enterprise product for sharing and managing technical calculations across an organisation. The company promoted the concept of calculation management — the structured design, documentation and governance of engineering calculations.

In April 2006, MathSoft Engineering and Education was acquired by Parametric Technology Corporation (PTC) for approximately $62 million. At the time of the acquisition the company had annual revenue of approximately $20 million, 130 employees and operations in seven countries including the United Kingdom, Germany and Japan. Mathcad subsequently continued as a PTC product.
