= Creo Parametric =

CAD software

PTC Creo Parametric
- Developer: PTC
- Release: 1987; 39 years ago
- Stable release: 11.0.3.0 / January 10, 2025; 19 months ago
- Operating system: Windows
- Type: CAD, CAM, CAE, PLM
- License: Trialware
- Website: ptc.com/product/creo

Creo Parametric, formerly known, together with Creo Elements/Pro, as Pro/Engineer (commonly referred to as Pro E) and Wildfire, is a solid modeling or computer-aided design (CAD), computer-aided manufacturing (CAM), computer-aided engineering (CAE), and associative 3D modeling application, that runs on Microsoft Windows.

Creo Parametric should not be confused with Creo Elements/Direct Modeling, formerly CoCreate ME10 (2D) and or ME30 (3D) CAD Products. The ex-CoCreate CAD Products are now owned by PTC and renamed Creo Elements/Direct Drafting and Creo Elements/Direct Modeling.

Creo Parametric is an application of a suite of 10 that provide collaborative solid modeling, assembly modelling, 2D orthographic views, finite element analysis, parametric modelling, sub-divisional and non-uniform rational B-spline (NURBS) surface modeling, technical drawing (drafting), and numerical control (NC) and tooling functionality for mechanical designers.

Creo Parametric competes directly with CATIA, SolidWorks, NX/Solid Edge, Inventor/Fusion, IRONCAD, and Onshape. It was created by Parametric Technology Corporation (PTC) and was the first of its kind to market.

The software uses a specific file naming scheme, not allowing certain characters like ä, ö, é, ő, ł, Đ, ... (including spaces).

== Overview ==
Creo Parametric (formerly Pro/Engineer), PTC's parametric, integrated 3D CAD/CAM/CAE software, is used by manufacturers for mechanical engineering, design, and manufacturing.

Pro/Engineer was the industry's first rule-based constraint (sometimes called "parametric" or "variational") 3D CAD modeling system. The parametric modeling approach uses parameters, dimensions, features, and relationships to capture intended model behavior. This design approach can be family-based or platform-driven, where the strategy is to use engineering constraints and relationships to quickly optimize the design, or where the resulting geometry may be complex or based upon equations. Creo Parametric provides a complete set of design, analysis and manufacturing abilities on one, integral, scalable platform. These required abilities include solid modeling, surfacing, rendering, data Interoperability, routed systems design, simulation, tolerance analysis, numerical control (NC) and tooling design.

Creo Parametric can be used to create a complete 3D digital model of manufactured goods. The models consist of 2D and 3D solid model data which can also be used downstream in finite element analysis, rapid prototyping, tooling design, and CNC manufacturing. All data are associative and interchangeable between the CAD, CAE, and CAM modules without data conversion. A product and its entire bill of materials (BOM) can be modeled accurately with fully associative engineering drawings, and revision control information. The associativity functionality in Creo Parametric enables users to make changes in the design at any time during the product development process and automatically update the end products. This ability enables concurrent engineering – design, analysis and manufacturing engineers working in parallel – and streamlines product development processes.

== Summary of abilities ==
Creo Parametric is a software application within the CAID/CAD/CAM/CAE category.

Creo Parametric is a parametric, feature-based modeling architecture incorporated into a single database philosophy with rule-based design abilities. It provides in-depth control of complex geometry. The abilities of the product can be split into the three main headings of Engineering Design, Analysis and Manufacturing. This data is then documented in a standard 2D production drawing or the 3D drawing standard ASME Y14.41-2003.

=== Product design ===
Creo Parametric offers a range of tools to enable the generation of a complete digital representation of the product being designed. In addition to the general geometry tools there is also the ability to generate geometry of other integrated design disciplines such as industrial and standard pipe work and complete wiring definitions. Tools are also available to support collaborative development.

A number of concept design tools that provide up-front Industrial Design concepts can then be used in the downstream process of engineering the product. These range from conceptual Industrial design sketches, reverse engineering with point cloud data and comprehensive free-form surface.

=== Analysis ===
Creo Parametric has numerous analysis tools available and covers thermal, static, dynamic and fatigue finite element analysis along with other tools all designed to help with the development of the product. These tools include human factors, manufacturing tolerance, mould flow and design optimization. The design optimization can be used at a geometry level to obtain the optimum design dimensions and in conjunction with the finite element analysis.

=== Surface modeling ===
Creo Parametric has good surface modeling abilities, using commands like Boundary blend and Sweep. Advanced options like Style (Interactive Surface Design Extension - ISDX) and Freestyle provide more abilities to create complex models easily.

=== Manufacturing ===
Creo Parametric provides tooling design and simulated CNC machining and output for use in manufacturing environments. Tooling options cover specialty tools for molding, die-casting and progressive tooling design.

== Release history ==
The UNIX version was discontinued after 4.0, except x86-64 Unix on Solaris. It was renamed Creo 1.0 after Pro/Engineer Wildfire 5.0 (rebranded PTC Creo Elements/Pro), occurred on October 28, 2010, which coincided with PTC's announcement of Creo, a new design software application suite.

For the first 10 years, PTC generally released 2 versions per year, with some exceptions. The initial release (Rev 1) was in 1988.

Version	Year
Release 1	1988
Release 2	...
Release 7	1991
Release 8	...
Release 9	
Release 10	
Release 11	
Release 12	1994
Release 13	1995
Release 14	1996
Release 15	
Release 16	
Release 17	
Release 18	
Release 19	
Release 20	
Pro/Engineer 2000i	2000
Pro/Engineer 2000i^{2}	2001
Pro/Engineer 2001	2001
Pro/Engineer Wildfire 1.0	2002
Pro/Engineer Wildfire 2.0	2004
Pro/Engineer Wildfire 3.0	2006
Pro/Engineer Wildfire 4.0	2008
Creo Elements/Pro (Pro/Engineer Wildfire 5.0)	2009
Creo Parametric 1.0	2011
Creo Parametric 2.0	2012
Creo Parametric 3.0	2014
Creo Parametric 4.0	2015
Creo Parametric 5.0	2018
Creo Parametric 6.0	2019
Creo Parametric 7.0	2020
Creo Parametric 8.0	2021
Creo Parametric 9.0	2022
Creo Parametric 10.0	2023
Creo Parametric 11.0	2024
Creo Parametric 12.0	2025
Creo Parametric 13.0	2026

== See also ==
- Comparison of computer-aided design software
- Creo
- Creo Elements/View
- Pro/DESKTOP

Comparable software

- Inventor
- CATIA
- Cimatron
- Siemens NX
- Solid Edge
- SolidWorks
- IRONCAD
- Onshape
- KeyCreator
