= Windchill (software) =

Family of Product Lifecycle Management software products

PTC Windchill
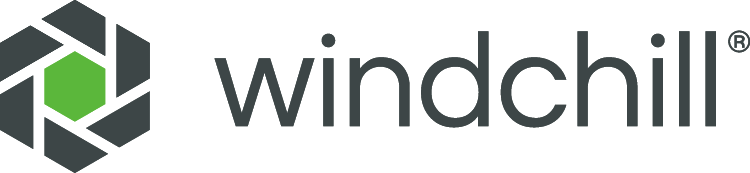
- Developer: PTC Inc.
- Release: 1998; 28 years ago
- Stable release: 13.1.4.0 / July 31, 2026; 2 months ago
- Operating system: Microsoft Windows, Linux
- Available in: English, Chinese (Simplified), Chinese (traditional), French, German, Italian, Japanese, Korean, Spanish, Polish, Portuguese (Brazil)
- Type: Product lifecycle management
- License: Proprietary
- Website: www.ptc.com/en/products/windchill

Windchill is a family of Product Lifecycle Management (PLM) software products that is offered by PTC Inc. In 2004, as part of their expansion in the area of collaboration tools, they arranged having "a hosted version of Windchill to small- and medium-sized customers." As of 2011, products from its marketer, PTC, were being used by over 1.1 million users worldwide.

== History ==
Windchill was originally developed by Windchill Technology Inc., which was co-founded by Jim Heppelmann, the current President and CEO of PTC. When PTC acquired Windchill Technology, Heppelmann joined the company as senior vice president. Windchill was released in 1998 and was promoted as the first to market with an internet based PLM offering. In 2001, Windchill ProjectLink was added as a project collaboration offering, and in 2002, Windchill PDMLink launched to enhance product data management.

In 2004 the parent company announced plans "to simplify its product management applications."

== Technology ==
Windchill's implementation has been described as multi-tier. Although it can run on a single server, when "serving thousands of end users on a global scale" it commonly uses three tiers: Client, Application and Database tiers.

Windchill software skills are taught in universities worldwide.

== Recent Releases ==
Version	Release date
Windchill 4.0	November 1999
Windchill 5.0	May 2000
Windchill 5.1	November 2000
Windchill 6.0	
Windchill 6.1	November 2001
Windchill 6.2.6	December 2002
Windchill 7.0	January 2004
Windchill 8.0	June 2005
Windchill 9.0	September 2007
Windchill 9.1	December 2008
Windchill 10.0	March 2011
Windchill 10.1	March 2012
Windchill 10.2; 10.2 M010; 10.2 M020; 10.2 M030	September 2013; December 2013; May 2014; March 2015
Windchill 11.0; 11.0 M010; 11.0 M020; 11.0 M030	December 2015; June 2016; November 2016; June 2017
Windchill 11.1; 11.1 M010	January 2018; May 2018
Windchill 11.2; 11.2.1.0	June 2019; December 2019
Windchill 12.0	June 2020
Windchill 13.0	June 2023

== Market ==
The Windchill user base ranges from individuals to large corporations. Most customers are in the following manufacturing market segments: Aerospace & Defense, Automotive, Electronics & High-Tech, Industrial Products, Medical Devices, Retail, Footwear & Apparel. Commercial sales are made through a combination of a direct sales force as well as an indirect sale channel. Directly competitive products to Windchill include Empower PLM by Omnify, Teamcenter by Siemens, ENOVIA by Dassault Systèmes and Agile by Oracle.

== Products ==
=== PDM & Process ===
- Windchill ProjectLink – Web-based project collaboration across product development.
- Windchill PartsLink-For categorizing the data and search.
- Windchill MPMLink – The industry's first integral software package for Manufacturing Process Management.
- FlexPLM – A PLM offering for retail, footwear & apparel and consumer product companies.
- Windchill PDMLink – A web-based master product data management repository that also helps teams manage critical processes such as change/configuration management, and detailed design.
- Arbortext Content Manager – helps control content creation, collaboration, management and publishing processes as they relate to technical product and service information.
- Windchill PPMLink – Provides Program Portfolio Management (PPM) capabilities to discrete manufacturers.
- Requirements Management – A combination of PTC's Integrity product and Windchill PDMLink to manage product software and hardware requirements.

=== Product Analytics ===
- Windchill Compliance – Tracks and manages product compliance throughout the product lifecycle.
- Windchill Materials & Substances – Integrates with existing enterprise systems to provide materials and substances in products based on an accurate BOM.
- Windchill Cost – Provides real-time product cost estimates and analysis.
- Windchill LCA – Allows manufacturers to use LCA (Lifecycle Assessment) data to quantify the environmental impact of products over their entire lifecycle.

=== Quality ===
- Windchill FRACAS – FRACAS (Failure Reporting, Analysis, and Corrective Action System) manages corrective action processes to improve product reliability.
- Windchill FMEA – Helps identify potential failure modes in a system.
- Windchill FTA – Constructs a graphical representation of an issue and provides an analysis tool.
- Windchill Prediction – Helps assess product reliability early in the design process.
- Windchill CAPA – Helps manage the intake, tracking, resolution, and analysis of quality issues.
- Windchill Nonconformance – manages the intake, evaluation, resolution and tracking of nonconforming products.
- Windchill Customer Experience Management – Helps manage and address customer complaints.

=== Service ===
- Windchill Service Information Manager – Helps organize and manage service information to ensure accuracy and relevance.
- Windchill Service Parts – Uses engineering CAD data to define spare parts information.

=== Collaboration ===
- Windchill SocialLink – Combines social computing with product data from Windchill to create product and practice collaboration environments for product teams.
- Windchill Mobile – Provides instant access to PTC's Windchill from an iPad or iPhone.

=== Utilities ===
- Windchill Archive – An optional module that automatically purges unnecessary information by archiving it into long-term storage.
- Windchill Print Service – Assists in printing Windchill content throughout the enterprise.
- Windchill Reporting –Develops and distributes reports across the enterprise.
- Windchill Interference Management Services – Identifies clashes between components in the design stage to resolve problems.
