= Joel Moses =

Israeli-American computer scientist (1941–2022)

Institute Professor Joel Moses
- יואל משה
- Born: 25 November 1941; Mandatory Palestine
- Died: May 29, 2022 (aged 80)
- Citizenship: United States
- Education: Columbia University (BA, MA); Massachusetts Institute of Technology (PhD)
- Known for: Lisp, Macsyma
- Scientific career
- Fields: Computer science
- Workplaces: MIT
- Thesis: Symbolic Integration (1967)
- Doctoral advisor: Marvin Minsky
- Website: www.csail.mit.edu/person/joel-moses

Joel Moses (Hebrew: יואל משה; 24 November 1941 – 29 May 2022) was an Israeli-American mathematician, computer scientist, and Institute Professor at the Massachusetts Institute of Technology (MIT).

== Biography ==
Joel Moses was born in Mandatory Palestine on 25 November 1941 and emigrated to the United States in 1954. He attended Midwood High School in Brooklyn, New York. He received his Bachelor of Arts (BA) degree in mathematics from Columbia University and a Master of Arts (MA) in mathematics, also from Columbia.

Under the supervision of Marvin Minsky, Moses received his Doctor of Philosophy (PhD) in mathematics at MIT in 1967 with a thesis entitled Symbolic Integration. This laid the groundwork for the Macsyma symbolic mathematics program that was created at MIT largely under his supervision between 1969 and 1983. Macsyma was able to solve problems such as simplification, polynomial factorization, indefinite integration, solution of differential equations, and other higher-order mathematical questions.

Moses served in administrative posts at MIT from 1974 and 1998: associate director of the Laboratory for Computer Science, head of Electrical Engineering and Computer Science Department, dean of Engineering, and provost. He also served as acting director of the Engineering Systems Division at MIT from 2006 to 2007 and acting director of the Center for Technology, Policy and Industrial Development from 2007 to 2010.

His memoirs are published. He was interviewed on the occasion of MIT's 150th anniversary. He appears in an independent documentary film named Plug & Pray, where he talks about the impact of ELIZA, a computer program published by Joseph Weizenbaum in 1966.

Moses was a fellow of the American Academy of Arts and Sciences, the Association for Computing Machinery (ACM), and the American Association for the Advancement of Science. He was a life fellow of the Institute of Electrical and Electronics Engineers (IEEE). Moses was also elected a member of the National Academy of Engineering (NAE) in 1986 for pioneering accomplishments in symbolic algebraic manipulations by computer, and for outstanding leadership in engineering education.
