= Les Houches Accords =

The Les Houches Accords are agreements between particle physicists to standardize the interface between the matrix element programs and the event generators used to calculate different quantities. The original accord was initially formed in 2001, at a conference in Les Houches, in the French Alps, before it was subsequently expanded.

In experimental high energy physics, several levels of computing are used to simulate data runs, including programs that generate matrix elements and ones that generate events. However, there are several programs for each of these tasks, such as CompHEP and MadGraph to generate matrix elements, and PYTHIA and HERWIG for event generation. Depending on specific properties of the particle decay that physicists are interested in, they may desire to use a certain program for these tasks, but before the Les Houches Accords, there was no general interface for communicating between the programs. This enables physicists to choose more freely between different programs. The Accords also make it easier to generate parton distribution functions, which are datasets used to calculate cross sections, for events.

The original Accord defined a programmatic interface for transfer of event information, in terms of Fortran common blocks, but no data exchange file format was defined until 2006. Events that conform to the formats described in the Les Houches Accords are said to be in Les Houches Event format, or more often, LHE format.

== See also ==
- Event generator

== Sources ==
- The original paper: E. Boos; et al. (September 2001). "Generic User Process Interface for Event Generators". arXiv:hep-ph/0109068.
- Les Houches Event Format paper: J. Alwall; et al. (2007). "A standard format for Les Houches Event Files". Computer Physics Communications. 176 (4): 300–304. arXiv:hep-ph/0609017. Bibcode:2007CoPhC.176..300A. doi:10.1016/j.cpc.2006.11.010. S2CID 28896441.
- General overview: Fermilab (December 2007), The Les Houches Accord (PDF)
- General information: P. Richardson (March 2006), "HERWIG and PYTHIA" (PDF), MC4BSM 2006, archived from the original (PDF) on 2006-09-26
- Example: CERN (February 23, 2011), Documentation on LHEanalysis program
