= Underlying event =

Term in particle physics

In particle physics, underlying event (UE) refers to the additional interactions of two particle beams at a collision point beyond the main collision under study. Specifically, the term is used for hadron collider events which do not originate from the primary hard scattering (high energy, high momentum impact) process. The term was first defined in 2002.

== Further explanation ==
Underlying events can be thought of as the remnants of scattering interactions. The UE may involve contributions from both "hard" and "soft" processes (here "soft" refers to interactions with low p-T, i.e. transverse momentum, transfer).

These are important both in the simulation of particle experiments (often using event generators); and interpretation and analysis of data so as to filter out the desired signals.

=== Features ===
Contents of UE include initial and final state radiation, beam-beam remnants, multiple parton interactions, pile-up, noise.

== See also ==
- Minimum bias event
- Drell–Yan process and the underlying event
