= Scattering generator =

The log of the S-matrix in scattering

In scattering theory, the scattering generator or S-generator is an effective Hamiltonian that directly generates the interaction-picture time evolution from far past to far future.

In quantum mechanics and quantum field theory, the scattering generator is the log of the S-matrix: $\hat{\Omega} = i\hbar \log\hat{S}$. While the concept traces back to '80s, an active revival has taken place in the modern literature on scattering theory and its applications. In classical mechanics, the classical scattering generator describes the Hamiltonian generator of the S-symplectomorphism, which is the classical analog of the S-matrix. The quantum and classical scattering generators are related by the classical limit by a precise correspondence.

== History and Motivation ==
=== Exponential representation of S-matrix ===
The idea of taking the log of S-matrix traces back to early days of quantum field theory and has been known as the exponential representation of S-matrix, which refers to the formula
$$\begin{aligned}
\hat{S} \,=\, \exp\bigg(\frac{1}{i\hbar}\, \hat{\Omega}\bigg)
\,.
\end{aligned}$$

=== Exponential representation as unit-time flow ===
Modern literature interprets $\hat{\Omega}$ as the unit-time generator of scattering, while prototypical observations trace back to the '80s. The above formula is viewed as an effective time evolution through dimensionless unit time:
$$\begin{aligned}
\hat{S} \,=\,
\exp\bigg(\frac{(\text{“}\mathit{\Delta}t = 1\text{”})}{i\hbar}\, \hat{\Omega}\bigg)
\,.
\end{aligned}$$
This means that the result of scattering $\hat{S}$ is directly reproduced within "one second" ($\mathit{\Delta}t = 1$) by taking $\hat{\Omega}$ as the Hamiltonian. In this sense, $\hat{\Omega}$ is viewed as an "effective Hamiltonian" that encapsulates and summarizes the entire history of scattering from $t=-\infty$ to $t=+\infty$.

=== Manifest unitarity ===
The motivation behind the exponential representation is manifest unitarity in scattering, i.e., trivializing the conservation of probability. Provided hermiticity $\hat{\Omega}^\dagger = \hat{\Omega}$,the S-matrix is automatically unitary as
$$\begin{aligned}
\hat{S}^\dagger \hat{S} \,=\, \exp\bigg({-\frac{1}{i\hbar}\, \hat{\Omega}}\bigg)
\exp\bigg(\frac{1}{i\hbar}\, \hat{\Omega}\bigg)
\,=\,
\hat{1}
\,.
\end{aligned}$$
This also applies for the classical scattering generator as well, the conservation of classical probability in the sense of Liouville theorem.

== Definition by Magnus Expansion ==
The S-matrix is concretely defined and computed by the Dyson series, which expands a time-ordered exponential.The scattering generator is concretely defined and computed by the Magnus series.

=== In quantum mechanics ===
For the quantum scattering generator $\hat{\Omega}$, the Magnus series formula reads
$$\begin{aligned}
\hat{\Omega}
\,=\,
{}&{}
\int dt_1\,\,
\hat{V}_\text{I}(t_1)
+
\frac{1}{2(i\hbar)^1}
\int_{t_1>t_2} d^2t\,\,
[\hat V_\text{I}(t_1),\hat V_\text{I}(t_2)]
\\
{}&{}
+
\frac{1}{6(i\hbar)^2}
\int_{t_1>t_2>t_3} d^3t\,\,
\Big(\,{
[ \hat V_\text{I}(t_1) , [ \hat V_\text{I}(t_2) , \hat V_\text{I}(t_3) ] ]
+
[ \hat V_\text{I}(t_3) , [ \hat V_\text{I}(t_2) , \hat V_\text{I}(t_1) ] ]
}\,\Big)
+ \cdots
\,.
\end{aligned}$$
This describes a sum of integrals whose integrands are nested commutators between the interaction-picture potential $\hat{V}_\mathrm{I}(t)$ at different times. Provided the free and interaction Hamiltonians are Hermitian, the scattering generator $\hat{\Omega}$ is also a Hermitian operator.

=== In classical mechanics ===
For the classical scattering generator $\Omega$, the Magnus series formula reads
$$\begin{aligned}
\Omega
\,=\,
{}&{}
\int dt_1\,\,
V_\text{I}(t_1)
+
\frac{1}{2}
\int_{t_1>t_2} d^2t\,\,
\{V_\text{I}(t_1),V_\text{I}(t_2)\}
\\
{}&{}
+
\frac{1}{6}
\int_{t_1>t_2>t_3} d^3t\,\,
\Big(\,{
\{ V_\text{I}(t_1) , \{ V_\text{I}(t_2) , V_\text{I}(t_3) \} \}
+
\{ V_\text{I}(t_3) , \{ V_\text{I}(t_2) , V_\text{I}(t_1) \} \}
}\,\Big)
+ \cdots
\,,
\end{aligned}$$
which can be deduced by taking the classical limit to the above quantum formula n spirit of the correspondence principle and canonical quantization. This assumes a Hamiltonian system defined on a phase space equipped with a Poisson bracket. $\Omega$ is a function on the phase space. $V_\text{I}(t)$ is a time-dependent function on the phase space, encoding the classical interaction Hamiltonian in the interaction picture.

More precisely, the frameworks of phase space formulation and deformation quantization have been employed to establish the relationship between $\hat{\Omega}$ and $\Omega$ in a rigorous fashion. The classical scattering generator is well-defined on Poisson manifolds.

The S-symplectomorphism $S$, i.e., the canonical transformation from the initial phase space to the final phase space in classical scattering, arises by exponentiating the Hamiltonian vector field of $\Omega$.

== Use ==
=== In quantum mechanics ===
In the interaction picture, the quantum Liouville equation reads
$$\begin{aligned}
\frac{d}{dt}\, \hat{\rho}_\mathrm{I}(t)
\,=\,
\frac{1}{i\hbar}\,[
\hat{V}_\mathrm{I}(t),
\hat{\rho}_\mathrm{I}(t)
]
\,,
\end{aligned}$$
where $\hat{\rho}_\mathrm{I}(t)$ is the density matrix in the interaction picture. Solving this equation gives rise to the S-matrix $\hat{S}$ as
$$\begin{aligned}
\hat{\rho}_\mathrm{I}(+\infty)
\,=\,
\hat{S}\, \hat{\rho}_\mathrm{I}(-\infty)\, \hat{S}{}^{-1}
\,=\,
\mathrm{Ad}_{\hat{S}}\, \hat{\rho}_\mathrm{I}(-\infty)
\,,
\end{aligned}$$
in terms of the adjoint action $\mathrm{Ad}_{\hat{S}}$. The formula $\hat{S} = e^{\hat{\Omega}/i\hbar}$ then implies
$$\begin{aligned}
\hat{\rho}_\mathrm{I}(+\infty)
\,&=\,
\exp\Big(\,{
\mathrm{ad}_{\hat{\Omega}/i\hbar}
}\,\Big)\, \hat{\rho}_\mathrm{I}(-\infty)
\,,\\
\,&=\,
\exp\bigg(\,{
\frac{1}{i\hbar}\, [ \hat{\Omega} , \,\,\, ]
}\,\bigg)\, \hat{\rho}_\mathrm{I}(-\infty)
\,,\\
\,&=\,
\hat{\rho}_\mathrm{I}(-\infty)
+ \frac{1}{i\hbar}\, [\hat{\Omega},\hat{\rho}_\mathrm{I}(-\infty)]
+ \frac{1}{2!(i\hbar)^2}\, [\hat{\Omega},[\hat{\Omega},\hat{\rho}_\mathrm{I}(-\infty)]]
+ \cdots
\,,
\end{aligned}$$
which describes a sum of nested commutators.

This describes that the entire time evolution of the quantum (ensemble) state from $\hat{\rho}_\mathrm{I}(-\infty)$ to $\hat{\rho}_\mathrm{I}(+\infty)$ is reproduced by a unit-time, exponentiated adjoint action of the scattering generator $\hat{\Omega}$.

=== In classical mechanics ===
In classical Hamiltonian mechanics, an analogous formula holds for the classical probability distribution $\rho(t)$, representing a statistical ensemble and evolving under the classical Liouville equation:
$$\begin{aligned}
\rho_\mathrm{I}(+\infty)
\,&=\,
\exp\Big(\,{
\{ \Omega , \,\,\, \}
}\,\Big)\, {\rho}_\mathrm{I}(-\infty)
\,,\\
\,&=\,
{\rho}_\mathrm{I}(-\infty)
+ \{{\Omega},{\rho}_\mathrm{I}(-\infty)\}
+ \frac{1}{2!}\, \{{\Omega},\{{\Omega},{\rho}_\mathrm{I}(-\infty)\}\}
+ \cdots
\,.
\end{aligned}$$
This is the nested Poisson bracket formula in the S-symplectomorphism framework.

=== Impulse formula ===
In quantum mechanics, the expectation value of an observable $\hat{\mathcal{O}}$ with respect to the density matrix $\hat{\rho}_\text{I}(t)$ in the interaction picture is
$$\begin{aligned}
\big\langle
\hat{\mathcal{O}}
\big\rangle_t
\,=\,
\mathrm{Tr}\big(\,\hat{\rho}_\text{I}(t)\,\hat{\mathcal{O}}\,\big)
\,.
\end{aligned}$$
The impulse of observables in quantum scattering is
$$\begin{aligned}
\big\langle
\hat\mathcal{O}
\big\rangle_{+\infty}
-
\big\langle
\hat\mathcal{O}
\big\rangle_{-\infty}
\,&=\,
e^{[\,\,\,\,,\hat{\Omega}/i\hbar]}
\hat\mathcal{O}
-\hat\mathcal{O}
\,=\,
\frac{1}{i\hbar}\, [\hat\mathcal{O},\hat{\Omega}]
+ \frac{1}{2!(i\hbar)^2}\, [[\hat\mathcal{O},\hat{\Omega}],\hat{\Omega}]
+ \cdots
\,.
\end{aligned}$$
In classical mechanics, the expectation value of an observable $\mathcal{O}$ with respect to the probability distribution $\rho_\text{I}(t)$ in the interaction picture is
$$\begin{aligned}
\big\langle
\mathcal{O}
\big\rangle_t
\,=\,
\int \rho_\text{I}(t)\, \mathcal{O}\,\, \mu
\,,
\end{aligned}$$
where $\mu$ is the Liouville measure. The impulse of observables in classical scattering is then
$$\begin{aligned}
\big\langle
\mathcal{O}
\big\rangle_{+\infty}
-
\big\langle
\mathcal{O}
\big\rangle_{-\infty}
\,&=\,
e^{\{ \,\,\, , \Omega \}} \mathcal{O}
- \mathcal{O}
\,=\,
\{\mathcal{O},{\Omega}\}
+ \frac{1}{2!}\, \{\{\mathcal{O},{\Omega}\},{\Omega}\}
+ \cdots
\,.
\end{aligned}$$
In both cases, the scattering generator acts on the observables as a Hamiltonian (thus in terms of right adjoint action). Note that the classical impulse formula also follows by implementing the pullback by the inverse of the S-symplectomorphism, which maps functions on the final phase space to functions on the initial phase space.

== Conventions and Terminology ==
Another prominent convention for the scattering generator uses the definition $\hat{N} = -i\hbar \log\hat{S}$ and the name "N-matrix." Technically speaking, the scattering generator should be distinguished from the Magnusian, which is a broader term that can refer to the logarithm of time-evolution maps (not necessarily in scattering). A clarification has been made between the classical scattering generator, the eikonal phase, and the on-shell action.

== See also ==
- S-matrix
- Unitarity
- Liouville's theorem (Hamiltonian)
- Interaction picture
- Density matrix
