= Scattering channel =

In scattering theory, a scattering channel is a quantum state of the colliding system before or after the collision ($t \to \pm \infty$). The Hilbert space spanned by the states before collision (in states) is equal to the space spanned by the states after collision (out states) which are both Fock spaces if there is a mass gap. This is the reason why the S matrix which maps the in states onto the out states must be unitary. The scattering channel are also called scattering asymptotes. The Møller operators are mapping the scattering channels onto the corresponding states which are solution of the Schrödinger equation taking the interaction Hamiltonian into account. The Møller operators are isometric.

== See also ==
- LSZ formalism
