= Anthony C. Hearn =

American computer scientist

- Education: University of Adelaide; University of Cambridge
- Known for: Gerasimov-Drell-Hearn sum rule REDUCE
- Awards: Fellow, Association for Computing Machinery (2006); Jonathan B. Postel Service Award (2009)
- Scientific career
- Fields: Particle physics Computer science
- Workplaces: Stanford University; Rutherford Laboratory; University of Utah; RAND Corporation

Anthony C. Hearn was an Australian-American computer scientist and adjunct staff member at RAND Corporation and at the Institute for Defense Analyses Center for Computing Sciences. He was best known for his pioneering contributions in mathematical software development, most notably in developing the computer algebra system REDUCE, the oldest such system still in active use. He was also one of the founders of the CSNET computer network, for which he shared the Jonathan B. Postel Service Award with Peter J. Denning, David Farber, and Lawrence Landweber in 2009. He was elected a Fellow of the Association for Computing Machinery in 2006 "for contributions to computer algebra and symbolic computation." In 2010 he received an honorary Doctor Of Laws degree from Brock University, Ontario, Canada. He received an honorary doctorate from the University of Erlangen–Nuremberg in Germany on November 30, 2012.

== Biography ==
Hearn attended the University of Adelaide for his bachelor's degree, graduating in 1958. He attended the University of Cambridge for his PhD in theoretical physics and graduated in 1962. From 1962 to 1964, he was a research associate in physics at Stanford University, returning as an assistant professor and Sloan Foundation Fellow in 1965 after a year at the Rutherford Laboratory in England. While at Stanford, he worked with Sidney Drell and formulated the Gerasimov-Drell-Hearn sum rule for connecting the Compton scattering amplitudes to the inclusive photoproduction cross sections in particle physics. In 1969, he joined the faculty at the University of Utah as an associate professor of physics and became full professor in 1971. Around this period he began using ideas and tools from computer science to help solve problems symbolically in high energy physics. From 1973 until 1980, he was professor and chair of the University of Utah School of Computing. He joined RAND Corporation in 1980 as head of the Information Sciences Department, where he served until 1984. He worked at the National Science Foundation as a member of the Program Advisory Committee for the Office of Advanced Scientific Computing from 1984 to 1986. He was a resident scholar at RAND from 1990 to 1996.
