= Portable Standard Lisp =

- Paradigms: Multi-paradigm: functional, procedural, object-oriented, reflective, meta
- Family: Lisp
- Developers: University of Utah; Hewlett-Packard; Zuse Institute Berlin
- First appeared: 1980; 45 years ago
- Typing discipline: Dynamic, strong
- Scope: Lexical, optional dynamic
- Implementation language: Lisp, assembly language
- Platform: 68000, DECSYSTEM-20, Cray-1, VAX
- License: BSD
- Website: user.ceng.metu.edu.tr/~ucoluk/research/lisp/generalinfo.html

Influenced by
- Lisp, Standard Lisp, Portable Lisp Compiler

Influenced
- Reduce

Portable Standard Lisp (PSL) is a programming language, a dialect of the language Lisp. PSL was inspired by its predecessor, Standard Lisp and the Portable Lisp Compiler. It is tail-recursive, late binding (or dynamically bound), and was developed by researchers at the University of Utah in 1980, which released PSL 3.1; development was handed over to developers at Hewlett-Packard in 1982 who released PSL 3.3 and up. Portable Standard Lisp was available as a kit containing a screen editor, a compiler, and an interpreter for several hardware and operating system computing platforms, including Motorola 68000 series, DECSYSTEM-20s, Cray-1s, VAX, and many others. Today, PSL is mainly developed by and available from Konrad-Zuse-Zentrum für Informationstechnik Berlin (ZIB). Its main modern use is as the underlying language for implementations of Reduce.

Like most older Lisps, in the first step, PSL compiles Lisp code to LAP code, which is another cross-platform language. However, where older lisps mostly compiled LAP directly to assembly language or some architecture dependent intermediate, PSL compiles the LAP to C code, which would run in a virtual machine language; so programs written in it are as portable as C in principle, which is very portable. The compiler was written in PSL or a more primitive dialect named System Lisp or SYSLISP as "... an experiment in writing a production-quality Lisp in Lisp itself as much as possible, with only minor amounts of code written by hand in assembly language or other systems languages." so the whole ensemble could bootstrap itself, and improvements to the compiler improved the compiler. Some later releases had a compatibility package for Common Lisp, but this is not sustained in the modern versions.

== Criticism ==
Portable Standard Lisp has fewer features than other Lisps, such as Common Lisp, and some people found it unpleasant to use. Richard P. Gabriel wrote in his popular essay Lisp: Good News, Bad News, How to Win Big, "the third most standard Lisp was Portable Standard Lisp, which ran on many machines, but very few people wanted to use it;".

== Timeline ==
Timeline of Lisp dialects
1958	1960	1965	1970	1975	1980	1985	1990	1995	2000	2005	2010	2015	2020
LISP 1, 1.5, LISP 2^{(abandoned)}
		Maclisp
			Interlisp
			MDL
				Lisp Machine Lisp
				Scheme				R5RS		R6RS	R7RS small
				NIL
					ZIL (Zork Implementation Language)
					Franz Lisp
					muLisp
					Common Lisp		ANSI standard
					Le Lisp
					MIT Scheme
					XLISP
						T
						Chez Scheme
						Emacs Lisp
						AutoLISP
						PicoLisp
						Gambit
							EuLisp
							ISLISP
							OpenLisp
							PLT Scheme				Racket
							newLISP
							GNU Guile
									Visual LISP
										Clojure
										Arc
										LFE
											Hy
