= Minimum bias event =

Minimum bias (MB) events are inelastic events selected by a high-energy experiment's loose (minimum bias) trigger with as little bias as possible. MB events can include both non-diffractive and diffractive processes although the precise definition and relative contributions vary among experiments and analyses. Quite often the beam hadrons ooze through each other and fall apart without any hard collisions occurring in the event. MB event is not the same as the underlying event (UE), which consists of particles accompanying a hard scattering. The density of particles in the UE in jet events is found to be roughly a factor of two greater than that in MB in proton-proton collisions at the Tevatron and the LHC.
