= STARlight =

Computer simulation event generator

STARlight is a computer simulation (Monte Carlo) event generator program to simulate ultra-peripheral collisions among relativistic nuclei. It simulates both photonuclear and two-photon interactions. It can simulate multiple interactions among a single ion pair, such as vector meson photoproduction accompanied by mutual Coulomb excitation.

These reactions are currently the primary method of studying photo-nuclear and two-photon interactions.

== History ==
STARlight was initially written in the late 1990s, in FORTRAN. After a period of expansion to include additional final states, etc. it was recoded into C++ in the early 2000s. The code is now hosted on the Hepforge code repository.

== Reactions simulated ==
- Two-photon production of lepton pairs
- Two-photon production of single mesons
- Photonproduction of vector mesons
- Generalized photoproduction (via an interface to DPMJet)

STARlight has been used by both STAR and PHENIX, at RHIC, and at the ALICE, CMS, ATLAS and LHC-b experiment at the Large Hadron Collider, for simulations of ultra-peripheral collisions.

STARlight is designed to handle complex reactions involving multiple photon exchange between a single ion pair. These reactions are important at heavy ion colliders, because, with the large nuclear charges, the probability of multi-photon interactions in near grazing collisions (impact parameter b just slightly above twice the nuclear radius) is large. STARlight does this by calculating cross-sections in an impact-parameter dependent formalism.

One of its major successes was the successful prediction of the cross-sections for ρ^{0} photoproduction at both RHIC and the LHC. It also accurately predicted the cross-section for e^{+}e^{−} pair production at RHIC and the LHC, using lowest order quantum electrodynamics. The latter reaction is important because it shows that there are no large higher order corrections, as could be expected because of the large nuclear charge. In both of the RHIC results, the presence of neutrons in downstream zero-degree calorimeters was used in the trigger, selecting events with impact parameters less than about 40 fermi; these events were then searched for photoproduced ρ^{0}.

A detailed description of the code is available.
