= Martinus J. G. Veltman =

Dutch theoretical physicist (1931–2021)

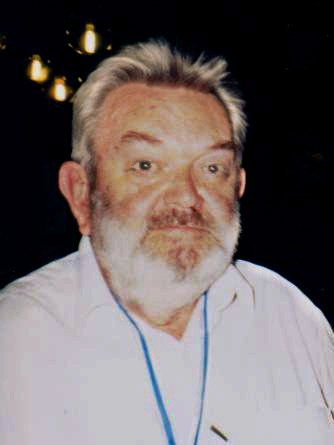
- Veltman in 2005
- Born: Martinus Justinus Godefriedus Veltman; 27 June 1931; Waalwijk, Netherlands
- Died: 4 January 2021 (aged 89); Bilthoven, Netherlands
- Education: Utrecht University
- Known for: Renormalization of Yang–Mills theory Dimensional regularization Schoonschip vDVZ discontinuity Passarino–Veltman reduction
- Awards: Nobel Prize in Physics (1999); Dirac Medal (1996); High Energy and Particle Physics Prize (1993)
- Scientific career
- Fields: Physics
- Workplaces: University of Michigan-Ann Arbor; Utrecht University
- Thesis: Intermediate particles in S-matrix theory and calculation of higher order effects in the production of intermediate vector bosons (1963)
- Doctoral advisor: Léon C. P. van Hove
- Doctoral students: Gerardus 't Hooft; Peter van Nieuwenhuizen; Bernard de Wit

Martinus Justinus Godefriedus "Tini" Veltman (Dutch pronunciation: [mɑrˈtinʏ ɕʏsˈtinʏs xoːdəˈfridʏs ˈtini ˈvɛltmɑn]; (Note: In isolation, Martinus, Justinus and Godefriedus are pronounced [mɑrˈtinʏs], [jʏsˈtinʏs] and [ɣoːdəˈfridʏs].) 27 June 1931 – 4 January 2021) was a Dutch theoretical physicist. He shared the 1999 Nobel Prize in Physics with his former PhD student Gerardus 't Hooft for their work on particle theory.

== Biography ==
Martinus Justinus Godefriedus Veltman was born in Waalwijk, Netherlands, on 27 June 1931. His father was the head of the local primary school. Three of his father's siblings were primary school teachers. His mother's father was a contractor and also ran a café. He was the fourth child in a family with six children. He started studying mathematics and physics at Utrecht University in 1948.

As a youth he had a great interest in radio electronics, which was a difficult hobby to work on because the occupying German army had confiscated most of the available radio equipment.

In 1955, he became an assistant to Prof. Michels of the Van Der Waals laboratory in Amsterdam. Michels was an experimental physicist, working in high pressure physics. His primary task was the upkeep of a large library collection and occasional lecture preparations for Michels.

His research career advanced when he moved to Utrecht to work under Léon Van Hove in 1955. He received his MSc degree in 1956, after which he was drafted into military service for two years, returning in February 1959. Van Hove then hired him as a doctoral researcher. He obtained his PhD degree in theoretical physics in 1963 and became professor at Utrecht University in 1966.

In 1960, Van Hove became director of the theory division at CERN in Geneva, Switzerland, the European High Energy laboratory. Veltman followed him there in 1961. Meanwhile, in 1960, he married his wife Anneke, who gave birth to their daughter Hélène in the Netherlands, before moving to Geneva to live with Martinus. Hélène followed in her father's footsteps and in due time completed her particle physics thesis with Mary Gaillard at Berkeley, though she now works in the financial industry in London.

In 1963/64, during an extended stay at SLAC he designed the computer program Schoonschip for symbolic manipulation of mathematical equations, which is now considered the very first computer algebra system.

Veltman was closely involved in the 1963 CERN neutrino experiment, analyzing images as they were generated by the detectors. When no spectacular events came out, enthusiasm waned, and after a while Veltman and Bernardini were the only ones analyzing the images. As a result, Veltman became the spokesman for the group at the Brookhaven Conference in 1963.

In 1971, Gerardus 't Hooft, who was completing his PhD under the supervision of Veltman, renormalized Yang–Mills theory. They showed that if the symmetries of Yang–Mills theory were to be realized in the spontaneously broken mode, referred to as the Higgs mechanism, then Yang–Mills theory can be renormalized. Renormalization of Yang–Mills theory is a major achievement of twentieth century physics.

In 1980, Veltman became member of the Royal Netherlands Academy of Arts and Sciences. In 1981, Veltman left Utrecht University for the University of Michigan-Ann Arbor, from where he retired in 1996. He subsequently moved back to the Netherlands.

In 1993 Veltman was awarded the High Energy Particle Physics Prize of the European Physical Society "for the role of massive Yang-Mills theories for weak interactions".

Eventually, he shared the Nobel Prize for Physics in 1999 with 't Hooft, "for elucidating the quantum structure of electroweak interactions in physics". Veltman and 't Hooft joined in the celebrations at Utrecht University when the prize was awarded.

In 2003, Veltman published a book about particle physics for a broad audience, entitled Facts and Mysteries in Elementary Particle Physics.

On 4 January 2021, Veltman died in his home in Bilthoven, the Netherlands.

Asteroid 9492 Veltman is named in his honor.

== See also ==
- Chiral anomaly
- Pauli–Villars regularization

== Bibliography ==
- Veltman, M. "Perturbation Theory of Massive Yang-Mills Fields", Utrecht Rijksuniversiteit (Netherlands). Instituut voor Theoretische Fysica. Paris Univ., Orsay (France). Laboratoire de Physique Théorique et Hautes Energies, (Aug. 1968).
- Veltman, M. & J. Yellin. "Some Comments on the Decays of eta (550)", Brookhaven National Laboratory, United States Department of Energy (through predecessor agency the Atomic Energy Commission), July 1966.
- Veltman, M. Facts and Mysteries in Elementary Particle Physics, World Scientific Publishing, 2003. ISBN 981-238-149-X.
