= Beamstrahlung =

Type of synchrotron radiation

Beamstrahlung (from beam + bremsstrahlung ) is the radiation from one beam of charged particles in storage rings, linear or circular colliders, namely the synchrotron radiation emitted due to the electromagnetic field of the opposing beam. Coined by J. Rees in 1978.

It is a source of radiation loss in colliders, more specifically a type of synchrotron radiation and because of that a beam particle is lost whenever, during the collision, it radiates a photon (or photons) of an energy high enough that the emittance particle falls outside the momentum acceptance. Furthermore, with a non-zero dispersion at the interaction point, beamstrahlung can also affect the transverse beam emittance, which can either be due to incompletely corrected beam optics errors or be intentionally introduced for the purpose of reducing the centre-of-mass energy spread for monochromatization.
