= Schoonschip =

- Developers: Martinus J. G. Veltman, Netherlands
- Release: 1967, 58–59 years ago
- Written in: Assembly language
- Platform: Atari, Amiga, Sun 3/60, NeXT, and Macintosh computers, with 680x0 CPUs
- Type: Computer algebra system

Schoonschip was one of the first computer algebra systems, developed in 1963 by Martinus J. G. Veltman, for use in particle physics.

"Schoonschip" refers to the Dutch expression "schoon schip maken": to make a clean sweep, to clean/clear things up (literally: to make the ship clean). The name was chosen "among others to annoy everybody, who could not speak Dutch".

Veltman initially developed the program to compute the quadrupole moment of the W boson, the computation of which involved "a monstrous expression involving in the order of 50,000 terms in intermediate stages"

The initial version, dating to December 1963, ran on an IBM 7094 mainframe. In 1966 it was ported to the CDC 6600 mainframe, and later to most of the rest of Control Data's CDC line. In 1983 it was ported to the Motorola 68000 microprocessor, allowing its use on a number of 68000-based systems running variants of Unix.

FORM can be regarded, in a sense, as the successor to Schoonschip.

Contacts with Veltman about Schoonschip have been important for Stephen Wolfram in building Mathematica.

== See also ==
- Comparison of computer algebra systems
