= CLPython =

Programming language written in Lisp

- Platform: Common Lisp
- Type: Python Programming Language Compiler
- License: LGPL
- Website: common-lisp.net/project/clpython/
- Repository: github.com/metawilm/cl-python

CLPython is an implementation of the Python programming language written in Common Lisp. This project allow to call Lisp functions from Python and Python functions from Lisp. Licensed under LGPL. CLPython was started in 2006, but as of 2013, it was not actively developed and the mailing list was closed.

== See also ==
- CPython - the default implementation of Python, written in C
- IronPython - an implementation of Python in C# targeting .NET and Mono
- Jython - an implementation of Python for the JVM
- Hy - an implementation of Lisp written in Python
