= Kawa (Scheme implementation) =

- Family: Lisp
- Designed by: Per Bothner
- Developer: The Kawa Community
- First appeared: 10 June 1996; 30 years ago
- Stable release: 3.1.1 / 16 January 2020; 6 years ago (w/R7RS compatibility)
- Implementation language: Java, Scheme
- Platform: Java virtual machine
- OS: Cross-platform
- License: MIT
- Website: www.gnu.org/software/kawa

Influenced by
- Lisp, Scheme

Kawa is a language framework written in the programming language Java that implements the programming language Scheme, a dialect of Lisp, and can be used to implement other languages to run on the Java virtual machine (JVM). It is a part of the GNU Project.

The name Kawa comes from the Polish word for coffee; a play on words, since Java is another familiar name for coffee.

Kawa is notable as one of the few programming languages with support for units of measure in the form of quantities.

== Integration with Java ==
Besides using the language Scheme, Java object fields and methods can be accessed using code such as: (invoke object 'method argument ...). This will invoke a Java method, and does the same thing as object.method(argument, ...) in Java. An object's fields can be accessed with: object:field-name or (invoke object 'field-name). Static (class) methods can be invoked with the function invoke-static. Kawa can be extended with Java code (by creating scheme functions in Java), and combined with other JVM implementations.

== See also ==
- List of JVM languages
