= Return statement =

Statement which ends execution of a function and resumes in the main code

In computer programming, a return statement causes execution to leave the current subroutine and resume at the point in the code immediately after the instruction which called the subroutine, known as its return address. The return address is saved by the calling routine, today usually on the process's call stack or in a register. Return statements in many programming languages allow a function to specify a return value to be passed back to the code that called the function.

== Overview ==
In C and C++, return exp; (where exp is an expression) is a statement that tells a function to return execution of the program to the calling function, and report the value of exp. If a function has the return type void, the return statement can be used without a value, in which case the program just breaks out of the current function and returns to the calling one. Similar syntax is used in other languages including Modula-2 and Python.

In Pascal there is no return statement. Functions or procedures automatically return when reaching their last statement. The return value from a function is provided within the function by making an assignment to an identifier with the same name as the function. However, some versions of Pascal provide a special function Exit(exp); that can be used to return a value immediately from a function, or, without parameters, to return immediately from a procedure.

Like Pascal, FORTRAN II, Fortran 66, Fortran 77, and later versions of Fortran specify return values by an assignment to the function name, but also have a return statement; that statement does not specify a return value and, for a function, causes the value assigned to the function name to be returned.

In some other languages a user defined output parameter is used instead of the function identifier.

Oberon (Oberon-07) has a return clause instead of a return statement. The return clause is placed after the last statement of the procedure body.

Some expression-oriented programming language, such as Lisp, Perl and Ruby, allow the programmer to omit an explicit return statement, specifying instead that the last evaluated expression is the return value of the subroutine. In other cases a Null value is returned if there is no explicit return statement: in Python, the value None is returned when the return statement is omitted, while in JavaScript the value undefined is returned.

In Windows PowerShell all evaluated expressions which are not captured (e.g., assigned to a variable, cast to void or piped to $null) are returned from the subroutine as elements in an array, or as a single object in the case that only one object has not been captured.

In Perl, a return value or values of a subroutine can depend on the context in which it was called. The most fundamental distinction is a scalar context where the calling code expects one value, a list context where the calling code expects a list of values and a void context where the calling code doesn't expect any return value at all. A subroutine can check the context using the wantarray function. A special syntax of return without arguments is used to return an undefined value in scalar context and an empty list in list context. The scalar context can be further divided into Boolean, number, string, and various reference types contexts. Also, a context-sensitive object can be returned using a contextual return sequence, with lazy evaluation of scalar values.

Many operating systems let a program return a result (separate from normal output) when its process terminates; these values are referred to exit statuses. The amount of information that can be passed this way is quite limited, in practice often restricted to signalling success or fail. From within the program this return is typically achieved by calling Exit (system call) (common even in C, where the alternative mechanism of returning from the main function is available).

== Syntax ==
Return statements come in many shapes. The following syntaxes are most common:

Language	Return statement	If value omitted, return
Ada, Bourne shell, (Note: in the Bourne shell, only integers in the range 0–255 may be returned) C, C++, C#, D, Java, JavaScript, PHP, Rust	return value;	In the Bourne shell, exit value of the last command executed in the function In C and C++, undefined behavior if function is value-returning In PHP, returns NULL In JavaScript, returns the value undefined In Java and C#, not permitted if function is value-returning
BASIC	RETURN	
Lisp	(return value)	Last statement value
Perl, Ruby	return @values; return $value; return; or a contextual return sequence	Last statement value
PL/I	return(expression); return;	Undefined behavior if procedure is declared as returning a value
Python	return value	None
Smalltalk	^ value	
Tcl	return return $value return -code error "Error message" or some more complicated combination of options	Last statement value
Visual Basic .NET	Return value	
Windows PowerShell	return value;	Object
x86 assembly	ret	Contents of eax register (by conventions)

In some assembly languages, for example that for the MOS Technology 6502, the mnemonic "RTS" (ReTurn from Subroutine) is used.

== Multiple return statements ==
Languages with an explicit return statement create the possibility of multiple return statements in the same function. Whether or not that is a good thing is controversial.

Strong adherents of structured programming make sure each function has a single entry and a single exit (SESE). It has thus been argued that one should eschew the use of the explicit return statement except at the textual end of a subroutine, considering that, when it is used to "return early", it may suffer from the same sort of problems that arise for the GOTO statement. Conversely, it can be argued that using the return statement is worthwhile when the alternative is more convoluted code, such as deeper nesting, harming readability.

In his 2004 textbook, David Watt writes that "single-entry multi-exit control flows are often desirable". Using Tennent's framework notion of sequencer, Watt uniformly describes the control flow constructs found in contemporary programming languages and attempts to explain why certain types of sequencers are preferable to others in the context of multi-exit control flows. Watt writes that unrestricted gotos (jump sequencers) are bad because the destination of the jump is not self-explanatory to the reader of a program until the reader finds and examines the actual label or address that is the target of the jump. In contrast, Watt argues that the conceptual intent of a return sequencer is clear from its own context, without having to examine its destination. Furthermore, Watt writes that a class of sequencers known as escape sequencers, defined as "sequencer that terminates execution of a textually enclosing command or procedure", encompasses both breaks from loops (including multi-level breaks) and return statements. Watt also notes that while jump sequencers (gotos) have been somewhat restricted in languages like C, where the target must be an inside the local block or an encompassing outer block, that restriction alone is not sufficient to make the intent of gotos in C self-describing and so they can still produce "spaghetti code". Watt also examines how exception sequencers differ from escape and jump sequencers; for details on this see the article on structured programming.

According to empirical studies cited by Eric S. Roberts, student programmers had difficulty formulating correct solutions for several simple problems in a language like Pascal, which does not allow multiple exit points. For the problem of writing a function to linearly searching an element in an array, a 1980 study by Henry Shapiro (cited by Roberts) found that using only the Pascal-provided control structures, the correct solution was given by only 20% of the subjects, while no subject wrote incorrect code for this problem if allowed to write a return from the middle of a loop.

Others, including Kent Beck and Martin Fowler argue that one or more guard clauses—conditional "early exit" return statements near the beginning of a function—often make a function easier to read than the alternative.

The most common problem in early exit is that cleanup or final statements are not executed – for example, allocated memory is not unallocated, or open files are not closed, causing leaks. These must be done at each return site, which is brittle and can easily result in bugs. For instance, in later development, a return statement could be overlooked by a developer, and an action which should be performed at the end of a subroutine (e.g. a trace statement) might not be performed in all cases. Languages without a return statement, such as standard Pascal don't have this problem. Some languages, such as C++ and Python, employ concepts which allow actions to be performed automatically upon return (or exception throw) which mitigates some of these issues – these are often known as "try/finally" or similar. Functionality like these "finally" clauses can be implemented by a goto to the single return point of the subroutine. An alternative solution is to use the normal stack unwinding (variable deallocation) at function exit to unallocate resources, such as via destructors on local variables, or similar mechanisms such as Python's "with" statement.

Some early implementations of languages such as the original Pascal and C restricted the types that can be returned by a function (e.g. not supporting record or struct types) to simplify their compilers.

In Java—and similar languages modeled after it, like JavaScript—it is possible to execute code even after return statement, because the finally block of a try-catch structure is always executed. So if the return statement is placed somewhere within try or catch blocks the code within finally (if added) will be executed. It is even possible to alter the return value of a non primitive type (a property of an already returned object) because the exit occurs afterwards as well.

== Yield statements ==
Cousin to return statements are yield statements: where a return causes a subroutine to terminate, a yield causes a coroutine to suspend. The coroutine will later continue from where it suspended if it is called again. Coroutines are significantly more involved to implement than subroutines, and thus yield statements are less common than return statements, but they are found in a number of languages.

== Call/return sequences ==
A number of call/return sequences are possible depending on the hardware instruction set, such as the following:

1. The CALL instruction pushes address of the next instruction on the stack and branches to the specified address. The RETURN instruction pops the return address from the stack into the instruction pointer and execution resumes at that address. (Examples: x86, PDP-11) In architectures such as the Motorola 96000, the stack area may be allocated in a separate address space known as the Stack Memory Space, distinct from the main memory address space. The NEC μPD7720 also features a stack with its own separate address space.
2. The CALL instruction places address of the next instruction in a register and branches to the specified address. The RETURN instruction sequence places the return address from the register into the instruction pointer and execution resumes at that address. (Examples: IBM System/360 and successors through z/Architecture, most RISC architectures)
3. The CALL instruction places address of the next (or current) instruction in the storage location at the call address and branches to the specified address+1. The RETURN instruction sequence branches to the return address by an indirect jump to the first instruction of the subroutine. (Examples: IBM 1130, SDS 9XX, PDP-8)

== See also ==
- Return type
- Exit status
