= SLIB =

- Original author: Aubrey Jaffer
- Release: 11 October 2001; 25 years ago
- Stable release: 3c3 / 19 September 2026; 2 months ago
- Written in: Scheme
- Available in: English
- Type: Library
- License: Public domain, BSD style
- Website: www.gnu.org/software/slib/
- Repository: cvs.savannah.gnu.org/viewvc/slib/slib/

SLIB is computer software, a library for the programming language Scheme, written by Aubrey Jaffer. It uses only standard Scheme syntax and thus works on many different Scheme implementations, such as Bigloo, Chez Scheme, Extension Language Kit 3.0, Gambit 3.0, GNU Guile, JScheme, Kawa, Larceny, MacScheme, MIT/GNU Scheme, Pocket Scheme, Racket, RScheme, Scheme 48, SCM, SCM Mac, and scsh. SLIB is used by GnuCash. Other implementations can support SLIB in a unified way through Scheme Requests for Implementation (SRFI) 96.

SLIB is a GNU package.
