= SCM file =

SCM file may refer to:

- A StarCraft map file
- A Grand Theft Auto Script file
- A Supreme Commander game 3D model file
- A lotus ScreenCam Screencast file
- An XML schema file
- A Scheme source file
- A TinyScheme script
- A GNU Privacy Guard script (modified TinyScheme)
