= Ben Darnell =

American computer programmer

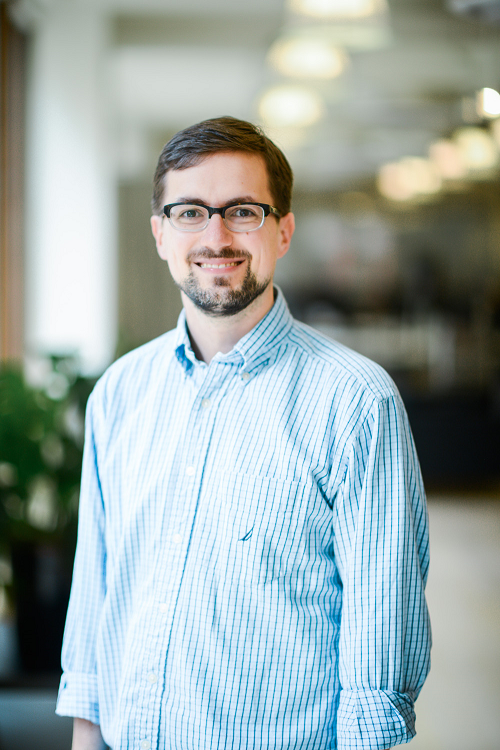
- Education: North Carolina State University
- Occupation: CTO
- Employer: Cockroach Labs
- Website: Ben Darnell on GitHub

Ben Darnell is an American computer programmer, entrepreneur, and business executive. He is the chief technology officer for Cockroach Labs, a company he co-founded in 2015. Prior to his work at Cockroach Labs, he worked for tech companies that include FriendFeed, Facebook, Brizzly, Dropbox, Viewfinder, and Square, Inc.

== Early life and education ==
Darnell entered North Carolina State University in 1998. He graduated in 2002 with a degree in computer science.

== Career ==
Darnell was an early employee of Google and was part of its Google Reader team. He worked with Thing Labs founders Jason Shellen and Chris Wetherell, two colleagues that he would later work with as part of Brizzly. He worked a total of seven years for Google and attributes it as being the foundation for his career as an engineer.

Darnell left Google to join FriendFeed. He joined Kevin Fox whom he also worked with at Google. Darnell began working at FriendFeed in July 2009. The company was purchased the following month by Facebook who incorporated Darnell into its team. A few months later, he left to work for startup Brizzly, a third-party interface for Twitter and Facebook that was later purchased by AOL. During his time at Brizzly, Darnell took over Tornado, an open source real-time web framework based on FriendFeed.

Darnell joined Spencer Kimball and Peter Mattis at Viewfinder in 2012. He met them in San Francisco when they showed him a sample of their work. He joined the team and worked primarily on the company's iPhone client app. Darnell joined the team at Square, Inc. after its purchase of Viewfinder in 2013.

Darnell helped launch CockroachDB in 2014 along with Kimball and Mattis. They later formed the company Cockroach Labs after launching the software as an open source project on GitHub. Darnell serves as the company's chief architect and also contributes to the source code development of CockroachDB.
