= Canvas (GUI) =

Container in computer graphics

In computer science and visualization, a canvas is a container that holds various drawing elements (lines, shapes, text, frames containing other elements, etc.). It takes its name from the canvas used in visual arts. It is sometimes called a scene graph because it arranges the logical representation of a user interface or graphical scene. Some implementations also define the spatial representation and allow the user to interact with the elements via a graphical user interface.

== Library support ==
Various free and open-source canvas or scene-graph libraries allow developers to construct a user interface and/or user-interface elements for their computer programs.

Examples of free and open-source scene-graph canvas options include:

- in C, Evas (in EFL) from the Enlightenment project→←
- in C, Clutter, associated with the GNOME project
- in C, GTK Scene Graph Kit (GSK)
- in C++ or optionally in Qt's own markup language QML: Qt Quick, provides a scenegraph associated with the Qt project
- in C++, OpenSceneGraph, a 3D graphics API using OpenGL
- in C++, the OGRE engine, based on a scene graph, supports multiple scene managers
- in C++, OpenSG, a scene-graph system for real-time graphics, with clustering support and multi-thread safety
- in C++, the FlightGear Flight Simulator uses a custom Canvas system (LGPL'ed via SimGear) that is hardware-accelerated using OpenSceneGraph/OpenGL, OpenVG/ShivaVG: The FlightGear Canvas system
- in Java, the Java FX scene graph with 2D and 3D functionality
- in Tcl and other languages such as Perl, Python (Tkinter), and Ruby, the Tk toolkit provides a canvas widget for 2D graphics
- in Tcl and other languages such as Perl and Python, TkZinc is an extended replacement for the Tk canvas, which adds support for hierarchical grouping, clipping, affine transformations, anti-aliasing, and specific items for air traffic control.

Some canvas modules within various libraries do not provide the power of a full scene-graph - they operate at a lower level which requires programmers to provide code such as mapping mouse-clicks to objects in the canvas. Examples of libraries which include such a canvas module include:

- in C++, KDE Plasma Workspaces Corona canvas
- the Canvas element in HTML5
- for Java, the AWT library Canvas
- for Java, the Java FX library Canvas
- for Java, the Swing library Canvas
- for Java, the SWT library Canvas, associated with Eclipse
- for Java-like JavaScript, the GWT library Canvas
- in C++, the papyrus Canvas library which renders using the Cairo (graphics) library
- in C, crcanvas, a GTK canvas widget which renders using the Cairo (graphics) library
- in C, GooCanvas, a GTK canvas widget which renders using the Cairo (graphics) library

Proprietary canvas libraries include, for example:

- the Microsoft Windows Win32 Canvas
