= TinyScheme =

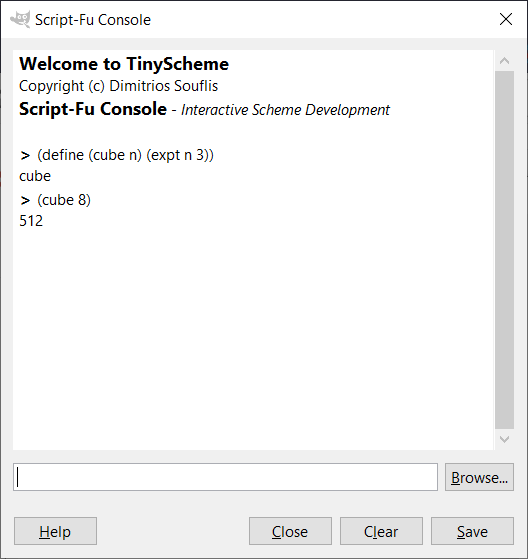
- Family: Lisp
- Developer: Dimitrios Souflis, Kevin Cozens, Jonathan S. Shapiro
- Stable release: 1.42 / 30 May 2020; 5 years ago
- License: BSD License
- Website: tinyscheme.sourceforge.net

TinyScheme is a free software implementation of the Scheme programming language with a lightweight Scheme interpreter of a subset of the R^{5}RS standard. It is meant to be used as an embedded scripting interpreter for other programs. Much of the functionality in TinyScheme is included conditionally, to allow developers to balance features and size/footprint.

TinyScheme is used by the GNU Image Manipulation Program (GIMP) starting with version 2.4, released in 2007. GIMP previously used SIOD.

TinyScheme was used as the core of Direct Revenue's adware, making it the world's most widely distributed Scheme runtime.
