= Gambit (Scheme implementation) =

- Paradigms: Multi-paradigm: functional, imperative, meta
- Family: Lisp
- Designed by: Marc Feeley
- First appeared: 1988; 38 years ago
- Stable release: 4.9.8 / August 2026; 0 months ago
- Typing discipline: Dynamic, latent, strong
- Scope: Lexical
- Platform: IA-32, x86-64
- OS: Cross-platform
- License: LGPL 2.1, Apache 2.0
- Website: gambitscheme.org

Influenced by
- Lisp, Scheme

Influenced
- Gerbil Scheme, Termite Scheme

Gambit, also called Gambit-C, is a programming language, a variant of the language family Lisp, and its variants named Scheme. The Gambit implementation consists of a Scheme interpreter, and a compiler which compiles Scheme into the language C, which makes it cross-platform software. It conforms to the standards R^{4}RS, R^{5}RS, and Institute of Electrical and Electronics Engineers (IEEE), and to several Scheme Requests for Implementations (SRFIs). Gambit was released first in 1988, and Gambit-C (Gambit with a C backend) was released first in 1994. They are free and open-source software released under a GNU Lesser General Public License (LGPL) 2.1, and Apache License 2.0.

By compiling to an intermediate representation, in this case portable C (as do Chicken, Bigloo and Cyclone), programs written in Gambit can be compiled for common popular operating systems such as Linux, macOS, other Unix-like systems, and Windows.

== Gerbil Scheme ==
Gerbil scheme is a variant of Scheme implemented on Gambit-C. It supports current R*RS standards and common SRFIs and has a state of the art macro and module system inspired by Racket.

== Termite Scheme ==
Termite Scheme is a variant of Scheme implemented on Gambit-C. Termite is intended for distributed computing, it offers a simple and powerful message passing model of concurrency, inspired by that of Erlang.

== C++ and Objective-C integration ==
While the Gambit compiler produces C code only, it has full integration support for C++ and Objective-C compilers such as GNU Compiler Collection (GCC). Thus, software written in Gambit-C can contain C++ or Objective-C code, and can fully integrate with corresponding libraries.

== See also ==
- Chicken (Scheme implementation)
- Stalin (Scheme implementation)
