= List of historical Twitter services and applications =

This is a list of notable services and applications used on the microblogging service Twitter before it became X. Twitter's ecosystem of applications and clients crossed one million registered applications in 2011, up from 150,000 apps in 2010. These Twitter apps were built by more than 750,000 developers around the world. A new app was registered every 1.5 seconds, according to Twitter. These various services and applications were designed to work with or enhance the Twitter. They were designed with various goals – many aimed to improve Twitter's functionality while others set out to make the service more accessible, particularly from other devices. Some applications allowed users to send messages (called tweets) directly, while others gave users the ability to create more complex tweets which they then had to manually post through Twitter itself.

Twitter was acquired by Elon Musk in 2022 and was later rebranded to X in 2023. The old Twitter API was replaced with a new paid API, killing off virtually all third-party clients and services.

== Table ==
Name	Platform	Function
HootSuite	Client, website	
ManageFlitter	Website application	A website application that assists Twitter users with unfollower management and general maintenance tasks.
Tweetbot	iOS and Mac OS X	Originally a mobile Twitter client for iOS platform making use of 3rd party picture sites and Apple's Push Notifications; a Mac OS X version was added in October 2012. Tweetbot was created by Tapbots.
TweetDeck	Chrome web app and desktop application	A desktop application which allows users to filter and group their own and others' tweets. The iPhone version was released on June 16, 2009.
Twitterfall	iOS and website	Twitterfall is a way of viewing the latest 'tweets' of upcoming trends and custom searches on the micro-blogging site Twitter. Updates fall from the top of the page in near-realtime.
Twitterrific	iOS and Mac OS X	An application allowing users to access Twitter and post tweets.
