= Libart =

- Developer(s): Raph Levien
- Final release: 2.3.21 / April 1, 2010; 15 years ago
- Repository: gitlab.gnome.org/Archive/libart_lgpl.git
- Written in: C
- Operating system: Cross-platform
- Type: Graphics library
- License: LGPL or GPL
- Website: levien.com

Libart is a free software graphics library of functions for 2D graphics supporting a superset of the PostScript imaging model. Libart was designed to be integrated with graphics, artwork, and illustration programs. It is written in optimized C and is fully compatible with C++. With a small footprint of 10,000 lines of code, it is especially suitable for embedded applications.

Libart provides a vector graphics-based API. Cairo obsoletes almost all uses of libart.

Libart supports a very powerful imaging model, basically the same as SVG and the Java 2D API. It includes all PostScript imaging operations, and adds antialiasing and alpha-transparency.

== History ==
Libart was a library for high-performance 2D graphics. Prior to being replaced with Cairo, it had been used as the anti-aliased rendering engine for the Gnome Canvas and for Gill, the Gnome Illustration app.

Gdk-pixbuf used to be a wrapper around libart.

A component of Libart, containing all functions needed for printing and running GNOME Canvas, was released under the LGPL. The version maintained under the GPL contained enhancements for unspecified specific applications.

=== Notable usage ===
- Eye of GNOME used libart
- The also abandoned GNOME Canvas widget uses Libart as its rendering API.
- GIMP used Libart for vector rendering.
- Dia could use Libart for antialiasing and PNG export.
