= Stalin (Scheme implementation) =

Scheme programming language

- Paradigms: Multi-paradigm: functional, imperative, meta
- Family: Lisp
- Designed by: Jeffrey Mark Siskind
- Developer: Jeffrey Mark Siskind
- Stable release: 0.11 / October 2, 2006; 18 years ago
- Typing discipline: Dynamic, latent, strong
- Scope: Lexical
- Platform: IA-32, x86-64
- OS: Cross-platform
- License: GPL
- Website: engineering.purdue.edu/~qobi/software

Influenced by
- Lisp, Scheme

In computing, Stalin (STAtic Language ImplementatioN) is a programming language, an aggressive optimizing batch whole-program Scheme compiler written by Jeffrey Mark Siskind. It uses advanced data flow analysis and type inference and a variety of other optimization methods to produce code. Stalin is intended for production use in generating an optimized executable.

The compiler runs slowly, with little or no support for debugging or other niceties. Full R4RS Scheme is supported, with a few minor and rarely encountered omissions. Interfacing to external C libraries is straightforward. The compiler does lifetime analysis and hence does not generate as much garbage as might be expected, but global reclamation of storage is done using the Boehm garbage collector.

The name is a joke: "Stalin brutally optimizes."

Stalin is free and open-source software, licensed under a GNU General Public License (GPL), and is available online.

== See also ==
- Chicken (Scheme implementation)
- Gambit (Scheme implementation)
