= Scheme 48 =

Dialect of the Scheme programming language

- Paradigms: Multi: functional, procedural, meta
- Family: Lisp
- Designed by: Richard Kelsey, Jonathan Rees
- Developers: Richard Kelsey, Jonathan Rees
- First appeared: March 1987; 38 years ago
- Stable release: 1.9.3 / 4 December 2024; 5 months ago
- Typing discipline: Dynamic, strong, Latent
- Scope: Lexical
- OS: Cross-platform
- License: BSD
- Website: s48.org

Scheme 48 is a programming language, a dialect of the language Scheme, an implementation using an interpreter which interprets bytecode. It has a foreign function interface for calling functions from the language C and comes with a library for regular expressions (regex), and an interface for Portable Operating System Interface (POSIX). It is supported by the portable Scheme library SLIB, and is the basis for the Scheme shell Scsh. It has been used in academic research. It is free and open-source software released under a BSD license.

It is called "Scheme 48" because the first version was written in 48 hours in August 1986. The authors now say it is intended to be understood in 48 hours.

== Implementation ==
Scheme 48 uses a virtual machine to interpret the bytecode, which is written in a restricted dialect of Scheme called PreScheme, which can be translated to C and compiled to a native binary. PreScheme, or Pre-Scheme, is a statically-typed dialect of Scheme with the efficiency and low-level machine access of C while retaining many of the desirable features of Scheme.

Pre-scheme was quite interesting. Kelsey published a paper on it, as well, I believe. It was Scheme in the sense that you could load it into a Scheme system and run the code. But it was restrictive – it required you to write in a fashion that allowed complete Hindley-Milner static type inference, and all higher-order procedures were beta-substituted away at compile time, meaning you could *straightforwardly* translate a prescheme program into "natural" C code with C-level effiency [sic]. That is, you could view prescheme as a really pleasant alternative to C for low-level code. And you could debug your prescheme programs in the interactive Scheme development environment of your choice, before flipping a switch and translating to C code, because prescheme was just a restricted Scheme. The Scheme 48 byte-code interpreter was written in prescheme. Prescheme sort of died – beyond the academic paper he wrote, Kelsey never quite had the time to document it and turn it into a standalone tool that other people could use (Ian Horswill's group at Northwestern is an exception to that claim – they have used prescheme

— Olin Shivers, "Olin Shivers: History of T"
