= Perspective cloning =

In computer graphics, perspective cloning is a general cloning technique in which an object is removed from a picture with elements from other parts.

What distinguishes cloning from perspective cloning is that perspective is automatically compensated for.

Photoshop version CS2 and the GIMP 2.3 have a perspective cloning tool.
