= Wikirank.com =

Wikirank.com was a website that tracked the popularity of Wikipedia articles. It was designed by Small Batch Inc, and acquired in March 2010.

Announced on 26 March 2009, Wikirank sifted through gigabytes of Wikipedia's publicly available traffic data and presented it in an intuitive interface. The homepage showed which Wikipedia articles were currently the most read, and which pages were gaining in popularity. The tool exposed how often a specific Wikipedia page had been viewed, and graphed those pageviews over time. It has been compared to Compete.

Service was terminated in 2010.

== Acquisition ==
In March 2010, it was announced that Wikirank had been bought by Brizzly, to become part of 'The Brizzly Guide'.
