= SIOD =

Programming language, dialect of Lisp

- Paradigms: Multi: functional, procedural, meta
- Family: Lisp
- Designed by: George J. Carrette
- Developer: George J. Carrette
- First appeared: April 1988; 36 years ago
- Stable release: 3.63 / 27 April 2008; 16 years ago
- Typing discipline: Strong, dynamic, latent
- Scope: Lexical
- Implementation language: C
- Platform: VAX, SPARC, IA-32
- OS: Cross-platform: Linux, Solaris, IRIX, OpenVMS, Windows
- License: LGPL
- Website: people.delphiforums.com/gjc//siod.html

Influenced by
- Lisp, Scheme

Influenced
- SCM, Guile

Scheme In One Defun, or humorously Scheme In One Day (SIOD) is a programming language, a dialect of the language Lisp, a small-size implementation of the dialect Scheme, written in C and designed to be embedded inside C programs. It is notable for being perhaps the smallest practical implementation of a Lisp-like language. It was written by George J. Carrette originally. It is free and open-source software released under a GNU Lesser General Public License (LGPL).

== Features ==
SIOD features include:

- Implements the original version of Scheme from the Lambda Papers, but none of the modern language standards.
- Represents a very early use of conservative garbage collection in a Lisp interpreter, a method later copied by SCM and Guile.
- Compiling is implemented by emitting a fixed machine code prologue followed by a fast-loading binary representation of the parse tree to be interpreted.

== Applications ==
- GNU Image Manipulation Program (GIMP) – SIOD was its primary extension language, Script-Fu, until GIMP 2.4 was released.
- Siag Office – Scheme in a Grid (SIAG) is a spreadsheet application using SIOD as a base.
- Festival Speech Synthesis System – SIOD is its underlying command interpreter.
