= GTK =

Free and open-source cross-platform widget toolkit for creating graphical user interfaces

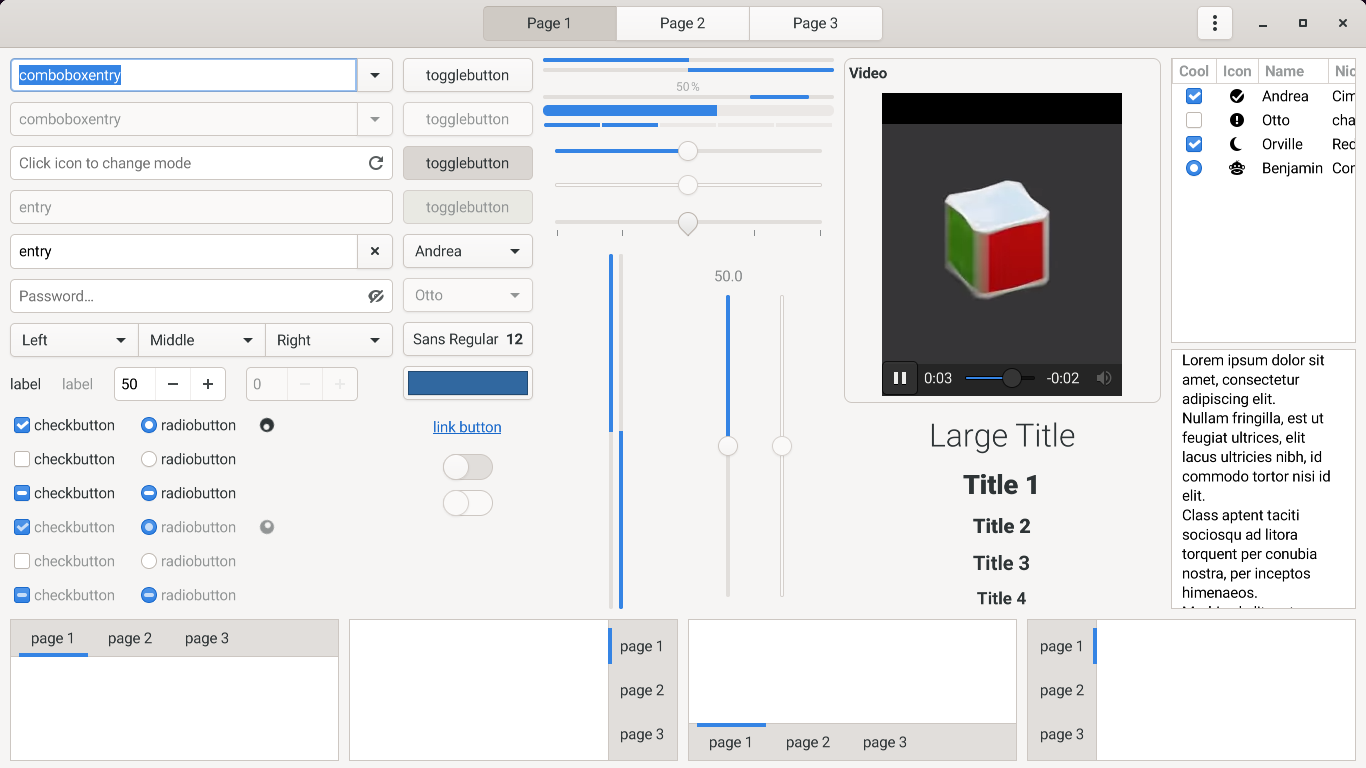
- GTK version 4 (gtk4-widget-factory, a collection of examples that demonstrate many of the GUI widgets)
- Original authors: Spencer Kimball, Peter Mattis
- Developers: The GNOME Project, eXperimental Computing Facility (XCF)
- Release: April 14, 1998; 28 years ago
- Stable release: 4.24.1 / 1 October 2026; 34 days ago
- Preview release: 4.19.2 / June 27, 2025; 16 months ago
- Written in: C, CSS
- Operating system: Linux and Unix-like; partial support for macOS and Windows
- Type: Widget toolkit
- License: LGPLv2.1+
- Website: gtk.org
- Repository: gitlab.gnome.org/GNOME/gtk

GTK (formerly GIMP ToolKit and GTK+) is a free and open-source widget toolkit for creating graphical user interfaces (GUIs) targeted at Linux and specifically GNOME (though with some use in other desktop environments). It is licensed under the terms of the GNU LGPL, allowing both free and proprietary software to use it.

The GTK team releases new versions on a regular basis. GTK 4 and GTK 3 are actively maintained, while GTK 2 is no longer supported. GTK 1 is independently maintained by the CinePaint project.

== Software architecture ==
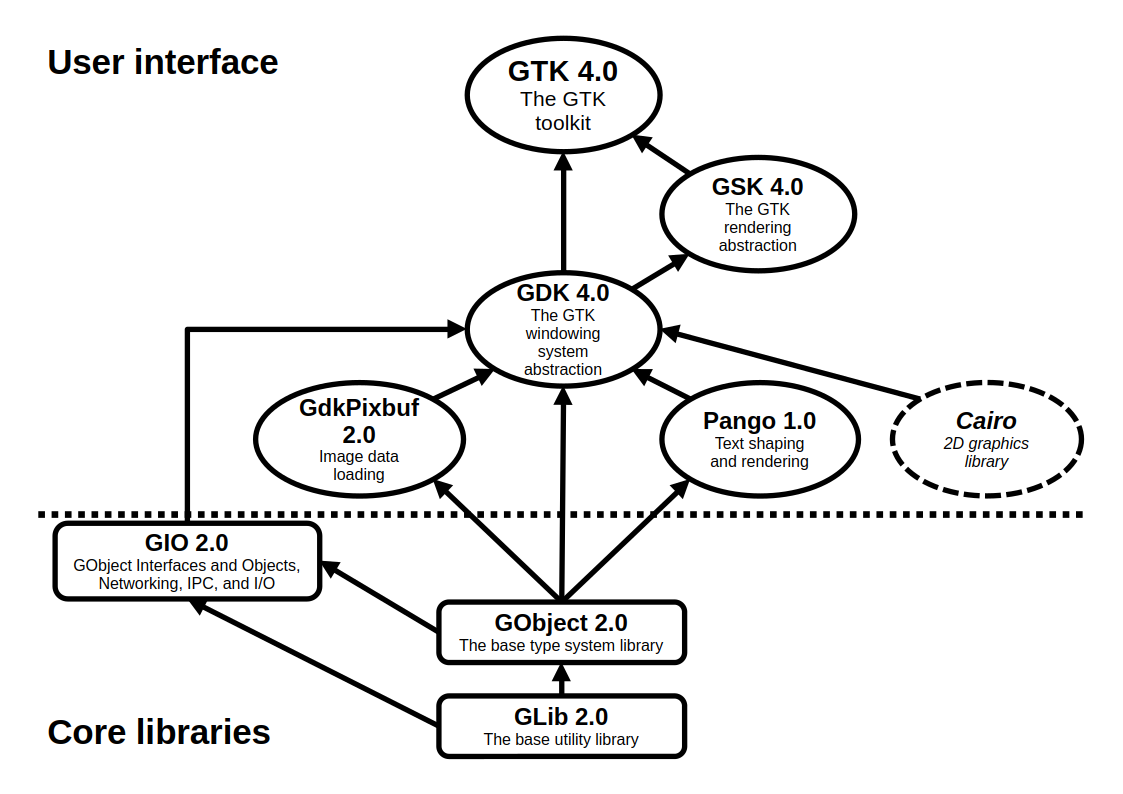
The GTK toolkit

Simplified software architecture of GTK. Pango, GDK, ATK, GIO, Cairo and GLib

GDK contains back-ends to X11, Wayland, Broadway (HTTP), Quartz, and GDI and relies on Cairo for the rendering. Its new SceneGraph is work-in-progress.

GTK is an object-oriented widget toolkit written primarily in C; it uses GObject (the GLib object system) for object orientation. The library provides a set of graphical control elements (widgets) for creating graphical user interfaces.

While GTK is primarily used on Linux and Unix-like systems via Wayland and the X11, it is cross-platform and supports Microsoft Windows (via the Windows API), macOS (via Quartz), and web browsers through the Broadway HTML5 backend.

Modern versions of GTK (GTK 4) utilize the GTK Scene Graph Kit (GSK) rendering engine, drawing graphical elements via Vulkan or OpenGL hardware acceleration. GTK also features a CSS engine that allows developers and users to customize widget appearance at both the application and system levels.

=== GTK Drawing Kit (GDK) ===
GDK acts as a wrapper around the low-level functions provided by the underlying windowing and graphics systems.

=== GTK Scene Graph Kit (GSK) ===
GSK is the rendering and scene graph API for GTK. GSK lies between the graphical control elements (widgets) and the rendering. GSK was finally merged into GTK version 3.90 released March 2017.

=== GtkBuilder ===
GtkBuilder allows user interfaces to be designed without writing code. The interface is described in an Extensible Markup Language (XML) file which is written by hand or generated by a GUI designer, which is then loaded at runtime and the objects created automatically. The description of the user interface is independent from the programming language being used.

=== Language bindings ===
Language bindings are available for using GTK from languages other than C, including C++, Genie, JavaScript, Perl, Python, Vala, and others.

=== Backends ===
GTK supports various backends, which provides different ways to display GTK applications depending on the system and environment. Examples of GTK backends are:

- Wayland – Used with the Wayland display server on some Unix-like systems, it is a modern replacement for X11.
- X11 – The default on Unix-like systems using the X.Org display server.
- Win32 – For running GTK applications on Windows.
- Quartz – For macOS support.
- Broadway – Allows GTK applications to run in web browsers using HTML5 and WebSocket.

== Development tools ==
=== GUI designers ===
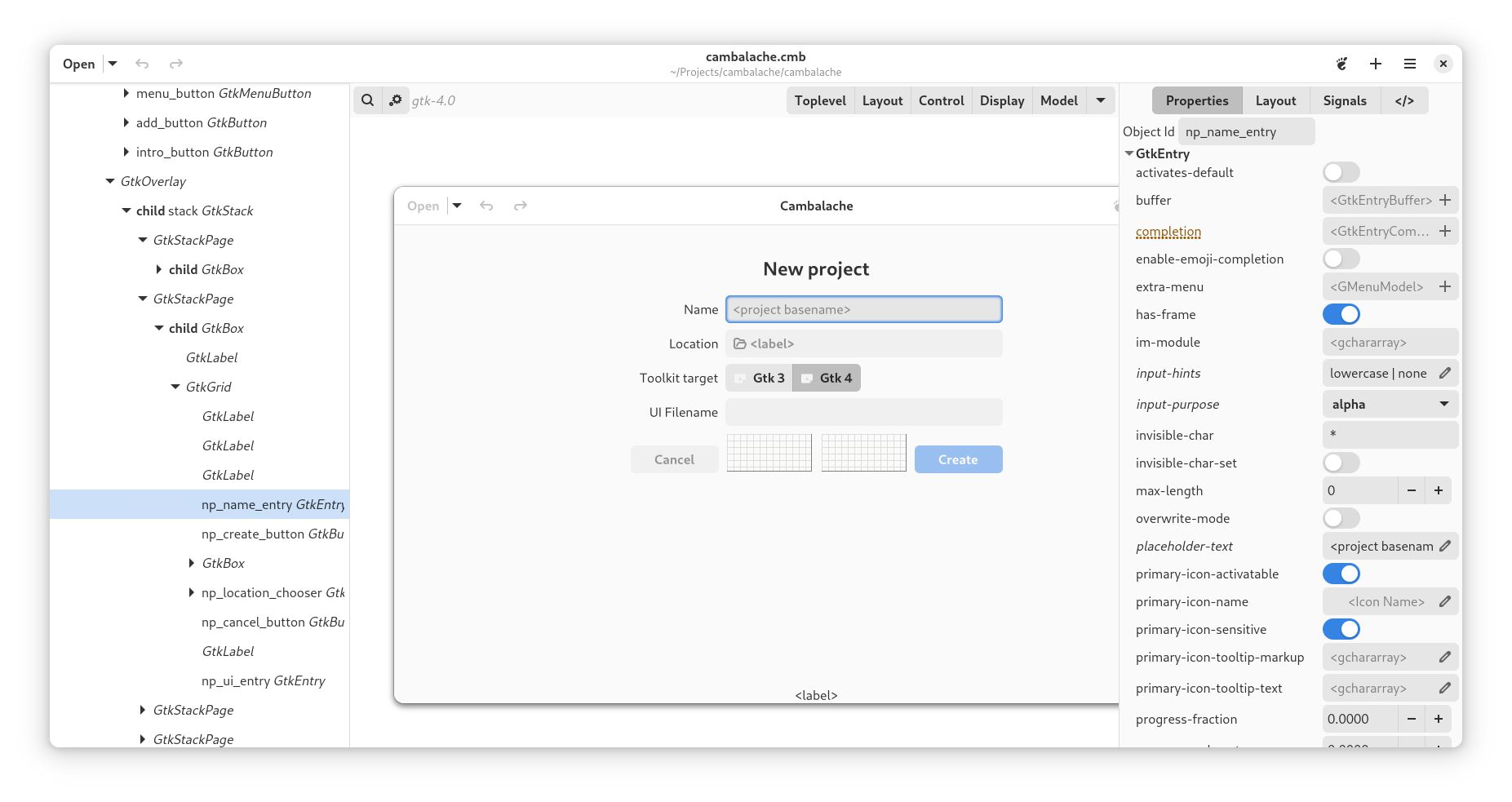
A screenshot of Cambalache Interface Designer

There are several GUI designers for GTK. Here is a selection of GTK GUI designers:

- Cambalache – a successor to Glade, supports GTK 4.
- Glade – supports GtkBuilder, which is a GTK built-in GUI description format. (not actively maintained)
- Gazpacho – GUI builder for the GTK toolkit written in Python
- Crow Designer – relies on its own GuiXml format and GuiLoader library.
- Stetic – part of MonoDevelop, oriented toward Gtk#.
- Gambas (since version 2.0 atop BASIC)
- Xojo
- Lazarus (on Linux defaults to interfacing with GTK 2)

=== GTK Inspector ===
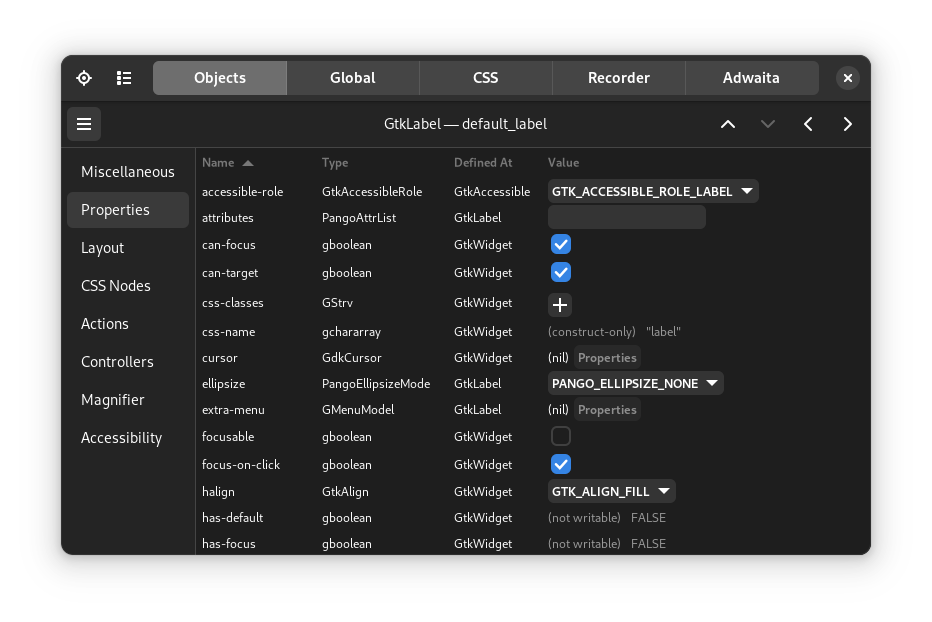
A screenshot of the GTK Inspector

The GTK Inspector is a built-in interactive debugging tool in GTK, allowing developers to inspect and modify UI elements, test CSS changes, and analyze widget structure in real time. It can be enabled using the Control + Shift + I or Control + Shift + D shortcuts, or by setting the GTK_DEBUG=interactive environment variable. It was introduced with GTK version 3.14.

==== Features ====
- Interactive debugging
- Real-time CSS testing and modifications
- Widget magnification for detailed inspection
- UI structure analysis and object property examination
- Customizable display settings via environment variables
- Detailed object inspection (type, state, properties, CSS, actions, etc.)
- Global application information display
- CSS rule debugging
- Rendering pipeline recording and inspection

== Development ==
GTK is mainly developed by The GNOME Project, which also develops the GNOME Development Platform and the GNOME Desktop Environment. GTK is mainly written in C. Many language bindings are available.

GNOME developers and users gather at an annual GNOME Users And Developers European Conference GUADEC meeting to discuss GNOME's current state and future direction. GNOME incorporates standards and programs from freedesktop.org to better interoperate with other desktops.

Many GNOME applications have been ported to GTK 4, which was released in December 2020, however some still use GTK+ 3 (GIMP being a major one).

=== Build automation ===
The master branch of GTK utilizes Meson for its build automation. GTK (and GNOME, GLib, etc.) formerly utilized the GNU Build System (named Autotools) as the build automation system of choice. Since August 14, 2017, the Autotools build system files have been dropped.

== Criticism ==
The most common criticism of GTK is the lack of backward-compatibility in major updates, most notably in the application programming interface (API) and theming. As a result, application and theme developers often have to rewrite parts of their code to ensure compatibility with newer versions of GTK.

The compatibility breaks between minor releases during the GTK 3.x development cycle was explained in 2013 by Benjamin Otte as due to strong pressures to innovate, such as providing the features modern users expect and supporting the increasingly influential Wayland display server protocol. Before its release, Benjamin Otte said that GTK 4 would lower the pressure to innovate and move GTK towards stability. Similarly, recent changes to theming are specifically intended to improve and stabilise that part of the API, meaning some investment now should be rewarded later. However, in 2025, GTK 5 is described in the official documentation as "a major new version of GTK that breaks both API and ABI compared to GTK 4.x.", like GTK 3 and 4.

- Aurélien Gâteau started Gwenview as an GTK application but switched to Qt early in development.
- Dirk Hohndel, codeveloper of Subsurface and member of Intel's Open-Source Technology Center, criticized the GTK developers for being abrasive and ignoring most community requests.
- Hong Jen Yee, the creator of LXDE, expressed disdain for the GTK3 toolkit's radical breaking API changes and increased memory usage, leading him to port the project to Qt, renaming it LXQt.
- The Audacious music player moved to Qt in version 3.6. The reasons stated by the developers for this include a transition to client-side window decorations, which they claim cause the application to look "GNOME-y and out of place."
- Wireshark has switched to Qt due to not having a good experience with GTK's cross-platform support.
- EasyEffects, a popular audio equalizer, is being ported to Qt.

== Use ==
GTK's support for Wayland requires applications to be adapted to Wayland as well.

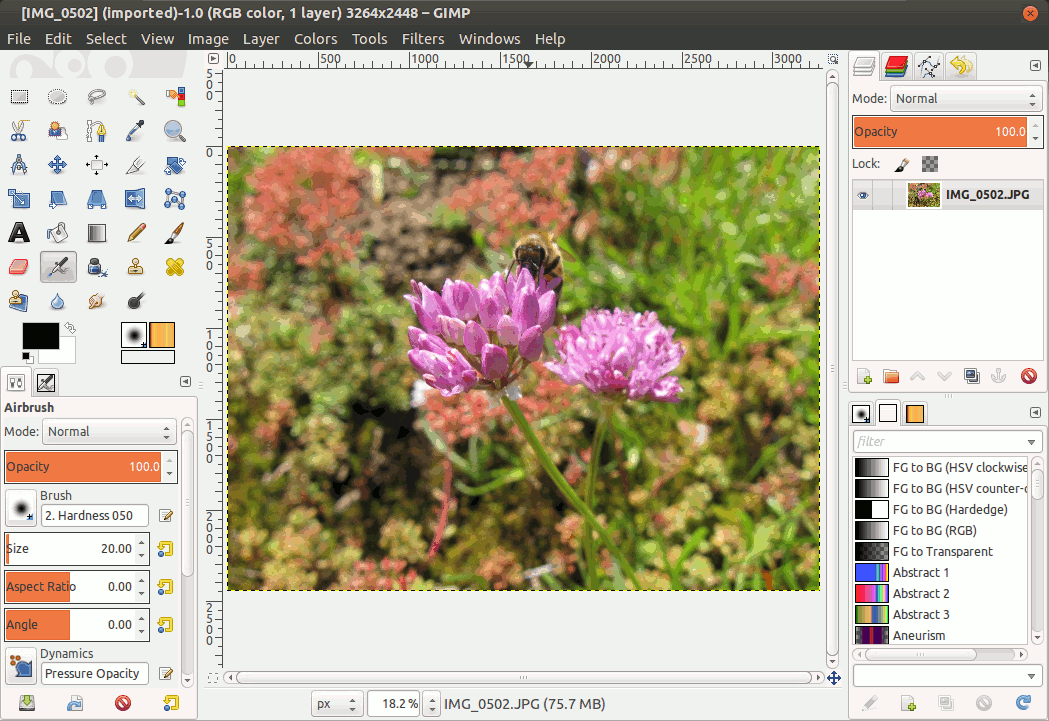
Screenshot of GIMP 2.8 – GTK is responsible for managing the interface components of the program, including the menus, buttons, and input fields.

=== Applications ===
Some notable applications that use GTK as a widget toolkit include:

- Ardour, a digital audio workstation (DAW)
- Deluge, a BitTorrent client
- Foliate, an ebook reader
- GIMP, a raster graphics editor for which GTK was created
- GNOME Core Applications, a collection of applications as a standard bundle of the GNOME desktop environment
- GNOME Circle, a collection of applications created to work within the GNOME ecosystem
- GNOME Evolution, a personal information manager
- HandBrake, digital video transcoder
- Inkscape, a vector graphics editor
- LibreOffice, an office suite
- Lutris, a game manager
- Mozilla Firefox, a web browser
- Mozilla Thunderbird, a personal information manager
- Pitivi, a video editor
- PCSX-Reloaded, a video game console emulator
- REAPER, a digital audio workstation (DAW)
- Remmina, a remote desktop client
- Transmission, a BitTorrent client

GTK programs can be run on desktop environments based on X11 and Wayland, or others including ones not made with GTK, provided the needed libraries are installed; this includes macOS if X11.app is installed. GTK can be also run on Microsoft Windows. It is used by some popular cross-platform applications like Pidgin and GIMP. wxWidgets, a cross-platform GUI toolkit, uses GTK on Linux by default. Other ports include DirectFB (for example used by the Debian installer).

=== Desktop environments ===
Several desktop environments utilize GTK as the widget toolkit.

==== Current ====
- GNOME, based on GTK, meaning that programs native to GNOME use GTK
- Budgie, built from scratch for the SolusOS successor, Solus Operating System
- Cinnamon, a fork of GNOME 3 which uses GTK version 3
- MATE, a fork of GNOME 2 which uses GTK 3 since version 1.18
- Xfce, based on GTK 3 since version 4.14
- Pantheon uses GTK 3 & 4, being developed by elementary OS
- Sugar, a desktop environment for youth primary education, which uses GTK, especially PyGTK
- Phosh, a mobile UI designed for PureOS
- LXDE (Lightweight X11 Desktop Environment) is based on GTK 2
- Unity, the former default desktop environment of Ubuntu

==== Inactive ====
- Access Linux Platform (successor of the Palm OS PDA platform)
- Consort, the GNOME 3.4 Fallback Mode – fork from Solus
- GPE, the GPE Palmtop Environment
- ROX Desktop, a lightweight desktop, with features from the GUI of RISC OS

=== Window managers ===
The following window managers use GTK:

- Aewm
- AfterStep
- Amaterus
- Consortium
- IceWM
- Marco
- Metacity
- Muffin
- Mutter
- Sawfish
- Wmg
- Xfwm

=== GtkSourceView ===
For syntax highlighting there is GtkSourceView, "source code editing widget". GtkSourceView is maintained by GNOME separately from GTK as a library: gtksourceview. There are plans to rename to gsv.

=== GtkSpell ===
GtkSpell is a library separate from GTK. GtkSpell depends on GTK and Enchant. Enchant is a wrapper for ispell, hunspell, etc., the actual spell checker engine/software. GtkSpell uses GTK's GtkTextView widget, to highlight misspelled words and offer replacement.

== History ==
GTK was originally designed and used in the GNU Image Manipulation Program (GIMP) as a replacement of the Motif toolkit; at some point Peter Mattis became disenchanted with Motif and began to write his own GUI toolkit named the GIMP toolkit and had successfully replaced Motif by the 0.60 release of GIMP. Finally GTK was re-written to be object-oriented and was renamed GTK+. This was first used in the 0.99 release of GIMP. GTK was subsequently adopted for maintenance by the GNOME Foundation, which uses it in the GNOME desktop environment.

=== GTK 2 ===
The GTK 2.0.0 release (2002) series introduced new features which include improved text rendering using Pango, a new theme engine, improved accessibility using the Accessibility Toolkit, transition to Unicode using UTF-8 strings, and a more flexible API. Starting with version 2.8, released in 2005, GTK 2 depends on the Cairo graphics library for rendering vector graphics.

=== GTK 3 ===
GTK version 3.0.0 (2011) included revised input device handling, support for themes written with CSS-like syntax, and the ability to receive information about other opened GTK applications. All rendering was done using Cairo.

The '+' was dropped returning to simply 'GTK' in February 2019 during a Hackathon.

=== GTK 4 ===
Release of the first GTK 4 version was in December 2020. At the 2018 edition of DevConf.cz, Matthias Clasen gave an overview of the then-current state of GTK 4 development, including a high-level explanation of how rendering and input worked in GTK 3, what changes were being made to GTK 4, and the reasons for those changes. Examples of things that have become possible with GTK 4 were given as well.

One of the main changes made during the GTK 4 development cycle (i.e. GTK 3.92, etc.) was the removal of user customization options (like individual keyboard shortcuts that could be set in GTK+ 2), and the delegation of functionality to ancillary objects instead of encoding it into the base classes provided by GTK. Other changes include:

- Event handling from signal handlers described by GtkWidget is delegated to event controllers.
- Rendering is delegated to GtkSnapshot objects.
- The layout mechanism is delegated from GtkWidget to GtkLayoutManager.
- Cairo was de-emphasized and Vulkan or GL were used instead to draw most graphical elements.

=== Releases ===
Release series	Initial release	Major enhancements	Latest minor version
1.0	1998-04-13	First stable version	1.0.
1.2	1999-02-25	New widgets: GtkFontSelector; GtkPacker; GtkItemFactory; GtkCTree; GtkInvisible; GtkCalendar; GtkLayout; GtkPlug; GtkSocket	1.2.10
2.0	2002-03-11	GObject Overall support for UTF-8	2.0.9
2.2	2002-12-22	Multihead support	2.2.4
2.4	2004-03-16	New widgets: GtkFileChooser; GtkComboBox; GtkComboBoxEntry; GtkExpander; GtkFontButton; GtkColorButton	2.4.14
2.6	2004-12-16	New widgets: GtkIconView; GtkAboutDialog; GtkCellView; The last to support Windows 98/Me	2.6.10
2.8	2005-08-13	Most widgets are rendered by Cairo	2.8.20
2.10	2006-07-03	New widgets: GtkStatusIcon; GtkAssistant; GtkLinkButton; GtkRecentChooser; Print support: GtkPrintOperation	2.10.14
2.12	2007-09-14	GtkBuilder	2.12.12
2.14	2008-09-04	JPEG 2000 load support	2.14.7
2.16	2009-03-13	New widget: GtkOrientable Caps Lock warning in password entry Improvements on GtkScale, GtkStatusIcon, GtkFileChooser	2.16.6
2.18	2009-09-23	New widget: GtkInfoBar Improvement on file chooser, printing To remove much of the necessary IPC between the X11 application and the X11 server, GDK is rewritten (mainly by Alexander Larsson) to use "client-side windows", i.e., the GdkWindow, which every widget must have, belongs now to the client	2.18.9
2.20	2010-03-23	New widgets: GtkSpinner; GtkToolPalette; GtkOffscreenWindow; Improvement on file chooser, keyboard handling, GDK Introspection data is now included in GTK	2.20.1
2.22	2010-09-23	GdkPixbuf moved to separate module Most GDK drawing are based on Cairo Many internal data are now private and can be sealed in preparation to GTK 3	2.22.1
2.24	2011-01-30	New widget: GtkComboBoxText which had previously been a custom widget shipped with Gtkmm The CUPS print backend can send print jobs as PDF GtkBuilder has gained support for text tags and menu toolbuttons and many introspection annotation fixes were added Migrating from GTK+ 2.x to GTK+ 3	2.24.33 (2020-12-21)
3.0	2011-02-10	Development and design of the GTK 3 release of the toolkit started in February 2009 during the GTK Theming Hackfest held in Dublin: The first draft of the development roadmap was released on April 9, 2009; Completed mostly Project Ridley: the attempt to consolidate several libraries that were external to GTK+; including libgnome, libgnomeui, libgnomeprint22, libgnomeprintui22, libglade, libgnomecanvas, libegg, libeel, gtkglext, and libsexy; All the rendering is done using Cairo GDK became more X11 agnostic XInput2, theme API is based on Cascading Style Sheets (CSS), worsening the achievable performance for 60 Hz frame rates	3.0.12
3.2	2011-09-25	New widgets: GtkLockButton; GtkOverlay; New Font Chooser dialog New experimental backends: Wayland; HTML5 (named "Broadway")	3.2.4
3.4	2012-03-26	Menu support in GtkApplication A new color chooser Added support for touch devices Added support for smooth scrolling GtkScrolledWindow will do kinetic scrolling with touch devices macOS support is improved This is the first version of GTK 3 that works well on Windows The Wayland backend is updated to the current Wayland version Spin buttons have received a new look Accessibility: the treeview accessible support is rewritten More complete CSS theming support	3.4.4
3.6	2012-09-24	New widgets: GtkSearchEntry; GtkMenuButton; GtkLevelBar; Vertical spin buttons CSS animations, blur shadows Support for cross-fading and transitions in themes	3.6.5
3.8	2013-03-25	Wayland 1.0 stable support Support for the broadwayd server Improved theming Better geometry management Touch improvements Support with the window manager for the frame synchronization protocol GdkFrameClock added	3.8.9
3.10	2013-09-23	New widgets: GtkHeaderBar; GtkPlacesSidebar; GtkStack; GtkStackSwitcher; GtkRevealer; GtkSearchBar; GtkListBox; Support for Wayland 1.2: maximization; animated cursors; multiple monitors; settings; custom surfaces; frame synchronization; Added: client-side decorations; scaled output support on high-dpi screens; fine-adjustment mode for scrolling; Removed: support for the Motif DND protocol; support for multiple screens per display; gdk_window_get_display; gtk_widget_push_composite_child; Tear-off menu-items, plus many GTK settings The modern GTK drawing model	3.10.9
3.12	2014-03-25	Client-side decorations Support for Wayland 1.5 New widget: GtkPopover (an alternative to menus and dialogs)	3.12.2
3.14	2014-09-22	GtkInspector (a copy of gtkparasite) introduced Improved support for gestures/multi-touch merged Deprecated: GtkMisc; GtkAlignment; GtkArrow; GdkColor; Style regions; support for .icon files; gdk_window_flush; drawing outside of begin/end paint; Most widgets converted to use gestures internally Wayland supports GNOME Shell classic mode	3.14.15
3.16	2015-03-22	GDK supports rendering windows using OpenGL for X11 and Wayland using libepoxy New widgets: GtkGLArea; GtkStackSidebar; GtkModelButton; GtkPopoverMenu; Scrolling overhauled (scrollbar hidden by default) Experimental Mir backend	3.16.7
3.18	2015-09-23	Add CSS node infrastructure More filechooser design refresh and better filechooser search Dropped Windows XP support Model support for list and flow box Kinetic touchpad scrolling Touchpad gestures (Wayland) gtk-builder-tool utility Output-only windows	3.18.9
3.20	2016-03-21	Further Integration of CSS nodes Move drag and drop down to GDK New widget: GtkShortcutsWindow (shows keyboard shortcuts and gestures of an application)	3.20.10
3.22	2016-09-21	Last 3.x release Wayland tablet support is merged, support for graphics tablets is considered feature complete GTK 3.22 shall be as rock-stable (and hence "boring") as GTK 2	for 3+ years 3.22.29
3.24	2018-09-03	3.22 was supposed to be the last version of GTK 3 series: 3.24 was mainly released to ease migrating from GTK+ 3.x to GTK+ 4; Dependency bumps – require: libepoxy 1.4; pango 1.41; New font chooser features: allow setting OpenType font features; show examples for OpenType font features; allow selecting OpenType font variations; support levels of details for selection; New Emoji features: support a completion popup for Emoji; drop Ctrl-Shift-e shortcut; Other new APIs: gdk_window_move_to_rect Wayland: use anonymous shared memory on FreeBSD Backported event controllers from GTK 4: GtkEventControllerScroll; GtkEventControllerMotion; GtkEventControllerKey; GtkGestureStylus; Deprecate a few APIs that are gone in GTK 4: focus chains in GtkContainer; stepper sensitivity in GtkRange	3.23.0; 3.23.1; 3.23.2; 3.23.3; 3.24.0...3.24.5; 3.24.14... 3.24.51
3.90	2017-03-31	GTK Scene Graph Kit (GSK) merged Remove any API marked as deprecated Heavy development: break API & ABI; A new Vulkan-renderer augments the old Cairo-renderer	3.89.1 3.89.2; 3.89.4; 3.89.5; 3.90
3.92	2017-10-18	As GNOME 3.26 was released already on September 13, 2017, it was not based on GTK 3.92. GNU autotools was replaced with Meson.	3.91.0 3.91.1; 3.91.2; 3.92.1
3.94	2018-06-26	3.93: GdkScreen, GdkVisual removed; GdkDeviceManager replaced by GdkSeat; Clipboard handling is moved from GTK to GDK; GdkEvent is converted to an opaque GObject; the GL renderer in GSK is substantially completed, and is now on par with the Vulkan renderer; the use of GdkPixbuf in APIs is reduced; and the GskTexture object is moved to GDK as GdkTexture, to take its place; the Wayland backend now implements the KDE server-side decoration protocol; Broadway is ported to GSK.; GdkWindow renamed to GdkSurface New abstraction for drawable content: GdkPaintable There is support for displaying media with: GtkVideo; GtkMediaFile; GtkMediaStream; GtkMediaControls	3.93; 3.94.0
3.96	2019-05-07	The gtk4-builder-tool simplify command has gained a --3to4 option to convert GTK3 ui files to GTK4; though with AMTK menus, toolbars or other objects like GtkShortcutsWindow are created programmatically (not with a *.ui file), but with convenient APIs. GtkWidget can now use a GtkLayoutManager for size allocation: layout managers can optionally use layout children holding layout properties; GtkBinLayout, GtkBoxLayout, GtkGridLayout, GtkFixedLayout and GtkCustomLayout are currently available; more layout manager implementations will appear in the future; Focus handling has been rewritten, and focus-change event generation has been unified with crossing events Events have been simplified and are just used for input: expose events have been replaced by a GdkSurface::render signal; configure events have been replaced by a GdkSurface::size-changed signal; map events have been replaced by a GdkSurface::mapped property; gdk_event_handler_set has been replaced by a GdkSurface::event signal; key events no longer contain a string; events on unmapped widgets are ignored	3.93; 3.94.0
3.98	2020-02-10	Performance improvements; Drag and drop refactoring; Moving GDK towards Wayland; Removals; GtkMenu, GtkToolbar and similar classes have been replaced by GMenu.; Additions; Emoji chooser; Text widgets now have undo stacks; A new layout manager	3.96.0
3.99.0	2020-07-31	Introduced successor to Accessibility Toolkit (ATK). The new approach will implement WAI-ARIA (World Wide Web Consortium (W3C) Accessibility Initiative – Accessible Rich Internet Applications).; Updated headers to use standard C types instead of GLib types; New widgets; Fixes and improvements	3.99.4
4.0	2020-12-16		4.0.3
4.2	2021-03-30		4.2.1
4.4	2021-08-23		4.4.1
4.6	2021-12-30		4.6.9
4.8	2022-09-06		4.8.3
4.10	2023-03-04	GtkFileChooser deprecated (use GtkFileDialog)	4.10.5
4.12	2023-08-05		4.12.5
4.14	2024-03-12		4.14.6
4.16	2024-06-09		4.16.12
4.18	2025-03-14		4.18.6
4.19	2025-04-06		4.19.4
4.20	2025-08-29		4.20.4
4.21	2025-09-29		4.21.6
4.22	2026-03-06		4.22.5
4.24	2026-09-12		4.24.0
Legend: Unsupported Supported Latest version Preview version Future version

== See also ==
- Client-side decoration
- List of widget toolkits
- gtkmm – C++ bindings for GTK
- Enlightenment Foundation Libraries (EFL) – widget toolkit written for the Enlightenment window manager
- FLTK – a light, cross-platform, non-native widget toolkit
- Fox toolkit – a fast, open source, cross-platform widget toolkit
- IUP – a multi-platform toolkit for building native graphical user interfaces
- Ultimate++
- Visual Component Library (VCL)

== Bibliography ==
- Krause, Andrew (April 23, 2007), Foundations of GTK+ Development (1st ed.), Apress, ISBN 978-1-59059-793-4
- Wright, Peter (May 15, 2000), Beginning GTK+ and GNOME (1st ed.), Peer Information, ISBN 978-1-86100-381-2
- Logan, Syd (September 6, 2001), Gtk+ Programming in C (1st ed.), Prentice Hall, ISBN 978-0-13-014264-1, archived from the original on September 30, 2012
