= Peter Mattis =

American computer programmer, entrepreneur

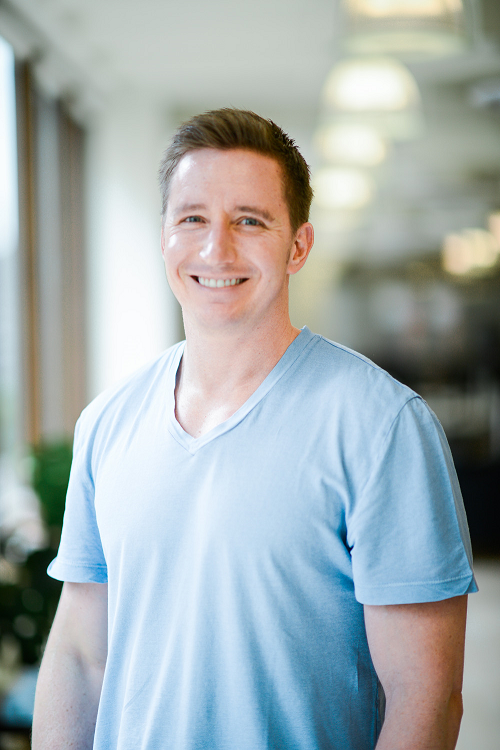
- Mattis in 2015
- Education: BS, Electrical Engineering and Computer Science
- Alma mater: University of California, Berkeley
- Occupation: Chief Technical Officer
- Employer: Cockroach Labs
- Known for: Computer Programming
- Website: Peter Mattis on LinkedIn

Peter Mattis is an American computer programmer, entrepreneur, and business executive. He is the CTO and co-founder for Cockroach Labs, a company he co-founded in 2014. His work as a programmer includes launching GNU Image Manipulation Program (GIMP) while still in college, and assisting the source code development of CockroachDB, the namesake software of Cockroach Labs.

== Early life and education ==
Mattis attended the University of California at Berkeley. While still a student in 1995, he developed the first version of GNU Image Manipulation Program (GIMP), along with his roommate Spencer Kimball. Mattis was also a member of a student club at Berkeley called the eXperimental Computing Facility (XCF). Mattis graduated from Berkeley in 1997 with a B.S. in Electrical Engineering and Computer Science.

According to Mattis in 1999:

Spencer did much more work on the GIMP proper while I did much more on GTK. This provided a fairly clean break that allowed us to work in parallel fairly easily. I probably wrote 95 percent of the original GTK code. The only widgets I didn't write were the file-selection widget, the text widget, and the rulers.

On free software and the motivations to write it and what makes good and enduring free software:

You should understand that the GIMP and GTK weren't written to fill holes in the software available under the GPL (GNU General Public License) and LGPL (GNU Lesser General Public License). The GIMP was started because I wanted to make a Web page. GTK was started because I was dissatisfied with Motif and wanted to see what it took to write a UI toolkit. These are purely selfish reasons. That is probably why the projects progressed so far and eventually succeeded. I find it much more difficult to work on something for extended periods of time for selfless reasons.

== Career ==
Mattis was previously employed as an engineer for Google, and is credited for his work Google Servlet Engine as well as helping spearhead Colossus, a new version of the Google File System.

In 2013, Mattis launched the company Viewfinder along with Kimball and Brian McGinnis, formerly of Lehman Brothers. The company developed an app that allowed social media users to share photos, chat privately, and search photo history without leaving the app. The company was acquired by Square, Inc. in December 2013. Mattis moved to Square's New York City office where he became a senior member of the company's East Coast team.

While at Google, Mattis used a database known as Bigtable, and followed the development of its next generation, known as Spanner. The database organizes data between thousands of servers to allow Google applications to stay online, even if an entire data center were to go offline. Mattis wanted to use this software but found there was nothing available outside of Google as either closed or open source that was similar.

He launched CockroachDB as an open source project on GitHub with Kimball, along with ex-Google Reader team member Ben Darnell. They later formed the company Cockroach Labs in order to accelerate development of the CockroachDB software. Mattis serves as the company's chief technical officer and also contributes to the source code development of CockroachDB.

== Personal life ==
Mattis is active in CrossFit and was named CrossFit South Brooklyn's athlete of the month in January 2014.
