= Geo-replication =

Geo-replication systems are designed to provide improved availability and disaster tolerance by using geographically distributed data centers. This is intended to improve the response time for applications such as web portals. Geo-replication can be achieved using software, hardware or a combination of the two.

== Software ==
Geo-replication software is a network performance-enhancing technology that is designed to provide improved access to portal or intranet content for users at the most remote parts of large organizations. It is based on the principle of storing complete replicas of portal content on local servers, and then keeping the content on those servers up-to-date using heavily compressed data updates.

=== Portal acceleration ===
Geo-replication technologies are used to provide replication of the content of portals, intranets, web applications, content and data between servers, across wide area networks WAN to allow users at remote sites to access central content at LAN speeds.

Geo-replication software can improve the performance of data networks that suffer limited bandwidth, latency and periodic disconnection. Terabytes of data can be replicated over a wide area network, giving remote sites faster access to web applications.

Geo-replication software uses a combination of data compression and content caching technologies. differencing technologies can also be employed to reduce the volume of data that has to be transmitted to keep portal content accurate across all servers. This update compression can reduce the load that portal traffic places on networks, and improve the response time of a portal.

=== Portal replication ===
Remote users of web portals and collaboration environments will frequently experience network bandwidth and latency problems which will slow down their experience of opening and closing files, and otherwise interacting with the portal. Geo-replication technology is deployed to accelerate remote end user portal performance to be equivalent to that experienced by users locally accessing the portal in the central office.

=== Differencing engine technologies ===
To deliver this reduction in the size of the required data updates across a portal, geo-replication systems often use differencing engine technologies. These systems are able to difference the content of each portal server right down to the byte level. This knowledge of the content that is already on each server enables the system to rebuild any changes to the content on one server, across each of the other servers in the deployment using content already hosted on those other servers. This type of differencing system ensures that no content, at the byte level, is ever sent to a server twice.

=== Offline portal replication on laptops ===
Geo-replication systems are often extended to deliver local replication beyond the server and down to the laptop used by a single user. Server to laptop replication enables mobile users to have access to a local replica of their business portal on a standard laptop. This technology may be employed to provide field access to portal content by, for example, sales forces and combat forces.

== Geo-replication systems ==
- iOra
- Syntergy
- Colligo Contributor

== See also ==
- Load balancing
- Round robin DNS
