= Jason Shellen =

American internet entrepreneur (born 1973)

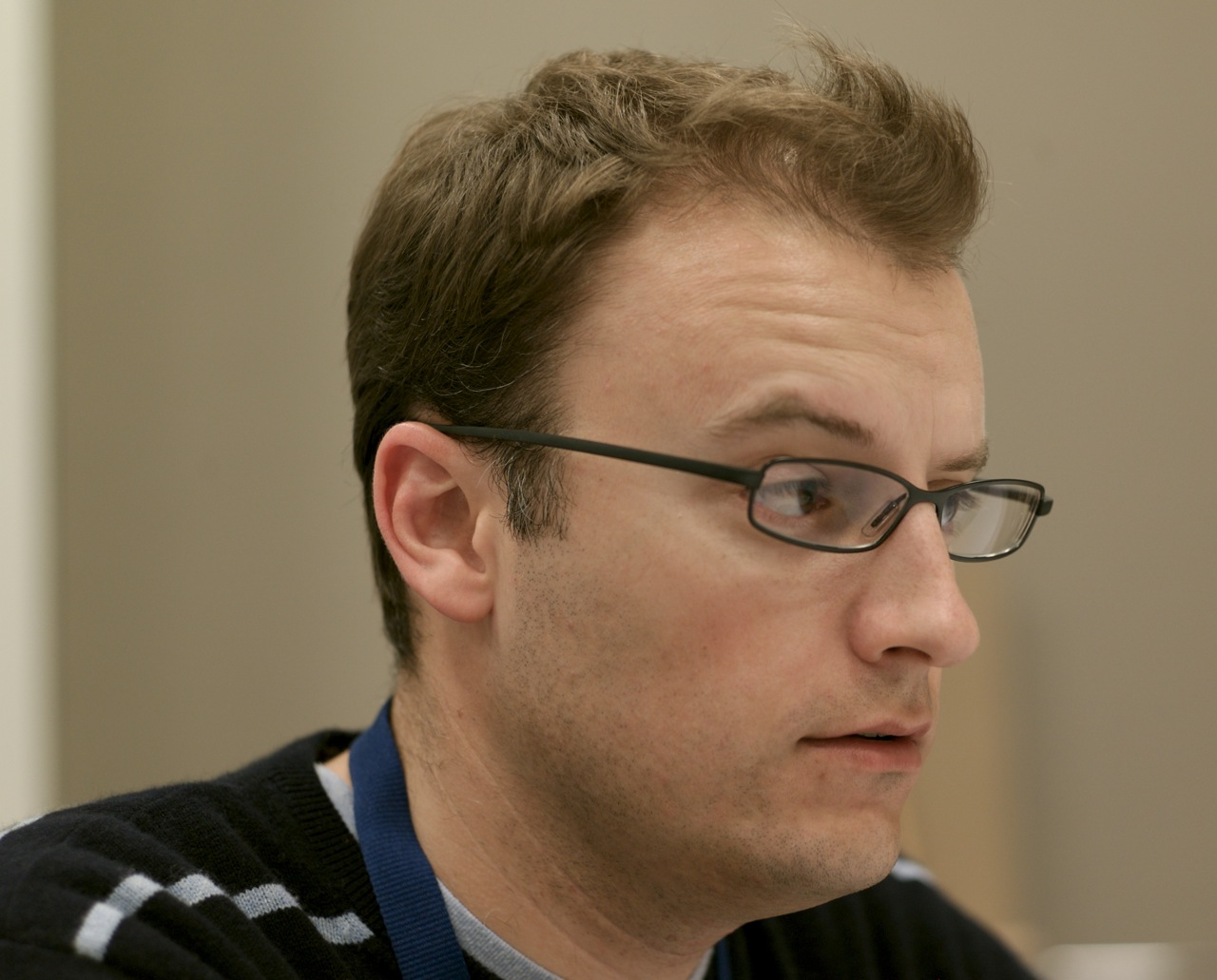
- Shellen (2007)
- Born: Jason Harper Shellen; August 30, 1973 (age 53)
- Education: Saint Mary's College of California (BA)
- Occupation: Internet entrepreneur
- Known for: Blogger, Google Reader, Brizzly

Jason Harper Shellen (born August 30, 1973) is an American internet entrepreneur who was the founding product manager of Google Reader and helped create and launch Brizzly. His most recent software startup is the email app Boxer. He has since 2006 been a member of the RSS Advisory Board, a group that publishes the RSS specification and helps developers with web syndication.

Shellen joined Google in 2003 when the company acquired Pyra Labs, which developed the Blogger blogging platform. He left Google four years later and became the vice president of product development of LiveJournal.

In 2008, Shellen created Thing Labs which was acquired by AOL in 2010 to bolster their AIM Messaging division. Having left AOL, Shellen advises startups in Silicon Valley. In October 2014 he was named as one of the investors in the Internet startup Delighted, which collects and analyzes customer feedback for businesses.

Shellen was the head of product platform efforts at Slack in 2016, leaving the company in December that same year. In 2018, Shellen announced that he had purchased Brizzly back.

== Boxer email app ==
In 2013, Shellen launched Boxer, an iOS app for quickly reading, sorting and responding to email. Shellen described one of its selling points in a Wired interview: "We're the only independent app that supports Gmail and Exchange. There are lots that do one or the other, but this is the only independent one that does both." Boxer was acquired by rival email app maker Taskbox in June 2013 and the latter company adopted the Boxer brand name. The combined company has 20 employees and is based in Austin, Texas. It received $2.8 million in financing from 36 investors in October 2013. On 13 October 2015 Boxer has reported that VMware has announced plans to acquire Boxer and integrate it as part of VMware's EMM solution AirWatch.

== Personal life ==
Shellen received a bachelor of arts in fine art from Saint Mary's College of California in 1996 and sits on the Board of Regents at Saint Mary's.

== See also ==
- Blogger (service)
- Google Reader
- Brizzly
- RSS Advisory Board
- History of web syndication technology
- Nofollow
