= Brizzly =

Third-party digital interface

- Website type: Social web reader
- Available in: English, German, Spanish, Japanese, Portuguese, French, Korean
- Owner: Thing Labs
- Website: brizzly.com
- Current status: Available

Brizzly was a third-party Twitter and Facebook interface. It was unveiled at one of TechCrunch's events in 2009 and was acquired by AOL in 2010.

Its features included allowing users to create lists to organize followers, showing user the full in-line links from URL shortening services and showing photos from photo sharing services. It was described as FriendFeed for Twitter.

On October 28, 2009, it released Facebook integration. On November 20, 2009, the Brizzly team announced that it was in open beta.

On March 1, 2012, Brizzly announced it was shutting down at the end of the month in light of time commitments by developers to AIM-related work.

On August 22, 2018, Co-Founder Jason Shellen announced Brizzly is back.

== See also ==
- List of Twitter services and applications
