= Direct Revenue =

- Industry: Software
- Founded: 2002
- Founder: Insight Venture Partners
- Defunct: 2007
- Headquarters: New York City

Direct Revenue was a New York City company which distributed software (a downloadable adware client) that displays pop-up advertising on web browsers. It was founded in 2002 and funded by Insight Venture Partners, known for creating adware programs. Direct Revenue included Soho Digital and Soho Digital International. Its competitors included Claria, When-U, Ask.com and products created by eXact Advertising. The company's major clients included Priceline, Travelocity, American Express, and Ford Motors. Direct Revenue's largest distributors were Advertising.com (acquired by AOL) and 247 Media (acquired by WPP). In October 2007, Direct Revenue closed its doors.

== New York State OAG lawsuit ==
On April 4, 2006, New York State Attorney General Eliot Spitzer filed suit against Direct Revenue in New York County Supreme Court, alleging that the company's software-distribution practices violated New York's General Business Law. In March 2008, Direct Revenue was granted a motion to dismiss all the OAG's allegations and the case was dismissed. In People v. Direct Revenue LLC, No. 401325/06 (N.Y. Sup.Ct., N.Y. Cty., March 12, 2008), a New York trial court dismissed the attorney general's deceptive-and-illegal-business-practices case against Direct Revenue. The AG sought billions of dollars in penalties against Direct Revenue, seeking to assert the rights of millions of consumers across the country who installed the Direct Revenue adware client.

29 transactions with Direct Revenue (or its distributors) were alleged. In transactions where the attorney general's investigator dealt directly with Direct Revenue, the installation of the adware client was preceded by a license agreement explaining how the adware client operated and how to uninstall it; the agreement also explained the limitations on Direct Revenue's liability. In each case the investigator clicked "yes" on a button, indicating assent to the agreement. There were problems with some installations that were initiated by Direct Revenue's third-party distributors (for example, the license agreement and uninstall instructions were not always displayed prior to installation). However, the court held that Direct Revenue was protected by its Standard Distribution Agreement, a document that directed the third-party distributors to obtain legally valid affirmative consent and make all legally necessary disclosures prior to installation of the adware client. Turning back claims based on the 29 transactions completed by state investigators, the court said there was no basis to entertain the attorney general's claims on behalf of all other individuals who allegedly downloaded the Direct Revenue adware client. Finally, it held, disgorgement of profits would not be an appropriate remedy in this case; Direct Revenue distributed its adware client free of charge and took nothing of value from consumers who downloaded it.

On February 16, 2007, DirectRevenue settled with the Federal Trade Commission without admitting to any wrongdoing and was barred from using affiliates who engage in "drive-by downloads" or what the FTC deems deceptive practices. They were also ordered to pay a settlement of $1.5 million. On June 26, 2007 the FTC issued final approval of the settlement: "No portion of the payment shall be deemed a payment of any fine, penalty, or punitive assessment". Direct Revenue closed several months later, in part due to the settlement.

=== Case analysis ===
In People v. Direct Revenue, the New York Attorney General in 2008 attempted to prevent Direct Revenue from distributing software that served pop-up advertising software on consumers’ computers. Direct Revenue did not charge fees to consumers; instead, it charges fees to the companies whose products it advertises. One line of attack by the New York Attorney General focused on Direct Revenue's “click-wrapped” (where the user clicks on “I accept”) end-user license agreement (EULA) and Direct Revenue's alleged deceptive and illegal practices. The court granted Direct Revenue's motion to dismiss the claims, noting that sufficient disclosure was given in the EULA and the required elements for an enforceable agreement were followed. New York then focused on the customer agreements of Direct Revenue's resellers, in an attempt to hold Direct Revenue liable. The result was the same as with the EULA—Direct Revenue was not held liable.

New York conceded that Direct Revenue's resellers were independent contractors, rather than agents. Generally, a principal is not liable for acts of an independent contractor due to the lack of control over how the contractor's work is performed. In addition, the court noted that Direct Revenue's software-distribution agreement required its distributors to obtain consumer consent consistent with the EULA and prohibited distributors from excluding themselves as agents of Direct Revenue. New York argued that Direct Revenue should be liable because its servers interacted with the consumers’ computers in the software-installation process. The court pointed out that participation in installation was insufficient liability, in the absence of participation in deceptive conduct which induced the installation. Finally, New York argued that Direct Revenue should be held liable for the actions of its resellers, on the ground that Direct Revenue ratified the conduct of its resellers. The court ruled that mere knowledge of consumer complaints was insufficient to impose liability on Direct Revenue, in light of the fact that when Direct Revenue had actual knowledge of reseller misconduct, it took steps to remedy the problem.

== Programs ==
- Aurora: Released April 2005, Aurora is an adware client notorious for the nail.exe component, and has been criticized on several fronts.
- BestOffers: Released September 2005, BestOffers is an adware client.
- BetterInternet: Released mid-2003, BetterInternet is another adware client, and is also used as an umbrella term for several other clients.
- MyPCTuneUp: the uninstaller which Direct Revenue provided for their software
