= SimGear =

SimGear is a group of libraries, which provide capabilities useful for simulations, visualizations, and even games building.

SimGear is a relatively new project, and while quite a bit of code has been written in conjunction with the FlightGear project, the final interface and arrangements are still evolving.

All the SimGear code is designed to be portable across a wide variety of platforms and compilers. Originally, it has been developed in support of the FlightGear project, but as development moved forward, it has become useful for other types of applications as well.

SimGear is free software, licensed under the terms of the GNU LGPL.
