= ManageFlitter =

- Website type: Social networking
- Available in: English
- Website: www.manageflitter.com
- Commercial: Yes
- Registration: Required
- Launched: February 2010; 16 years ago
- Current status: Offline

ManageFlitter was a web-based application that assists Twitter users gain insight into their Twitter account. ManageFlitter provides a set of tools that allows Twitter users to effectively curate, prune and grow their Twitter account. In addition, ManageFlitter provides an easy way for users to integrate their Google+ account with their Twitter account.

== History ==
ManageFlitter was developed by Sydney-based digital agency Melon Media as an internal side project for Melon Media's Founder Kevin Garber when he wanted a tool to help him identify who wasn't following him back on his Twitter account. ManageFlitter was subsequently spun out of Melon Media and ManageFlitter is now a separate company. A free version of ManageFlitter was launched in February 2010 and a commercial "Pro" version of ManageFlitter was launched in February 2011. October 2011 saw the release of a "Business" version of ManageFlitter that included multi-account management and other enhanced features.

Originally the service was called "ManageTwitter". The name was subsequently changed to "ManageFlitter" to avoid infringing on the Twitter trademark.

During April 2010, there was some controversy when Twitter alleged ManageFlitter was violating Twitter's API Terms of Service. ManageFlitter and Twitter managed to reach a compromise and ManageFlitter has been able to operate continuously since then.

ManageFlitter allows Twitter users to identify who don't follow them or lack other desirable traits and subsequently unfollow them. ManageFlitter users can analyse their Twitter account data in a variety of ways with ManageFlitter. ManageFlitter also assists Twitter users in scheduling Tweets for specified times and assists a team in managing a Twitter account's @ replies in an effective manner. As of September 2014 over 2.5 million Twitter users had used ManageFlitter.

== Business ==
ManageFlitter's headquarters are in Sydney Australia. ManageFlitter's chief executive officer and Co-founder is Kevin Garber and its chief technology officer and Co-founder is James Peter. ManageFlitter's business model is a freemium model which allows users to use the service for free but provides them with the option of upgrading to gain access to premium features.

As of September 2014, ManageFlitter has received no external funding.

== Reception ==
ManageFlitter was awarded 39th place in the Australian Anthill SMART100 2011 awards and was awarded 17th place in the Readers' Choice category of these awards.

In March 2012, ManageFlitter was announced as a finalist in the Shorty Awards in the "apps" category.

In September 2014, ManageFlitter was named a finalist in the Premier's NSW Export Awards in the Information & Communication Technology category.
