= Bigloo =

- Paradigms: Multi-paradigm: functional, procedural, meta
- Family: Lisp
- Designed by: Manuel Serrano
- Developer: INRIA
- First appeared: 1995; 31 years ago
- Stable release: 4.7a / 5 June 2026; 5 months ago
- Typing discipline: Strong, dynamic, latent
- Scope: Lexical
- Platform: ARM, IA-32, x86-64; PowerPC, Alpha
- OS: Cross-platform: Android, Windows, macOS, Linux, AIX, Solaris, Tru64 UNIX
- License: GPL, LGPL
- Website: www-sop.inria.fr/indes/fp/Bigloo

Influenced by
- Lisp, Scheme

Bigloo is a programming language, an implementation of the language Scheme, a dialect of the language Lisp. It is developed at the French IT research institute French Institute for Research in Computer Science and Automation (INRIA). It is oriented toward providing tools for effective and diverse code generation that can match the performance of hand-written C or C++. The Bigloo system contains a Scheme compiler that can generate C code and Java virtual machine (JVM) or .NET Framework (.NET) bytecode. As with other Lisp dialects, it contains an interpreter, also termed a read–eval–print loop (REPL). It is free and open-source software. The run-time system and libraries are released under a GNU Lesser General Public License (LGPL). The compiler and programming tools are released under a GNU General Public License (GPL).

Bigloo has support for multithreading. Bigloo also has a module that interfaces with GTK+ and Java Swing to create graphical interfaces. Researchers at the University of Arizona used Bigloo as a baseline for benchmarking the performance of novel compiler optimizations.

== See also ==
- List of JVM languages
