= Scsh =

Unix shell

- Original author: Olin Shivers
- Developers: Brian Carlstrom; Martin Gasbichler; Mike Sperber
- Release: 31 October 1994; 31 years ago
- Stable release: 0.6.7 / 16 May 2006; 20 years ago
- Written in: Scheme 48
- Operating system: Unix-like
- Platform: IA-32
- Size: 4.2 MB
- Available in: English
- Type: Unix shell
- License: BSD-3-Clause
- Website: www.scsh.net
- Repository: github.com/scheme/scsh

Scsh (a Scheme shell) is command-line shell derived from Scheme 48, an implementation of the Scheme programming language. It turns common POSIX shell features (string processing, file-name matching, input/output redirection, etc.) into a Scheme application programming interface in a manner to make the most of Scheme's ability for scripting. It is free and open-source software released under the BSD-3-Clause license.

Scsh, in its original form (a Scheme 48 fork), is limited to 32-bit platforms. There is a development version in the form of a Scheme 48 library that works in 64-bit mode.

== Features ==
Scsh includes these notable features:

- A shell language, modeled using quasi-quotation;
- Library support for list, character, and string manipulations;
- Regular expressions manipulation support using scheme regular expressions, a domain-specific language (DSL), or little languages, approach to the abilities;
- High-level support for awk-like scripts, integrated into the language as macros;
- Full access to the POSIX API plus BSD sockets, resulting in strong networking support;
- Abstractions supporting pseudo terminals.

== Example ==
- Translation of the shell pipeline gunzip < paper.tex.gz | detex | spell | lpr -Ppulp &:

(& (| (gunzip) (detex) (spell) (lpr -Ppulp)) ; background a pipeline 
    (< paper.tex.gz))                         ; with this redirection

- Print a list of all the executables available in the current PATH to the standard output:

#!/usr/local/bin/scsh -s
!#

(define (executables dir)
  (with-cwd dir
    (filter file-executable? (directory-files dir #t))))
(define (writeln x) (display x) (newline))

(for-each writeln
  (append-map executables ((infix-splitter ":") (getenv "PATH"))))

== "Acknowledgments" ==
The reference manual for Scsh includes a spoof Acknowledgments section written by Olin Shivers. It starts:

Who should I thank? My so-called "colleagues", who laugh at me behind my back, all the while becoming famous on my work? My worthless graduate students, whose computer skills appear to be limited to downloading bitmaps off of netnews? My parents, who are still waiting for me to quit "fooling around with computers," go to med school, and become a radiologist? My department chairman, a manager who gives one new insight into and sympathy for disgruntled postal workers?

and concludes with:

Oh, yes, the acknowledgements. I think not. I did it. I did it all, by myself.

== See also ==
- Unix shell
- Comparison of command shells
