= CinePaint =

Free software for retouching bitmap frames of films

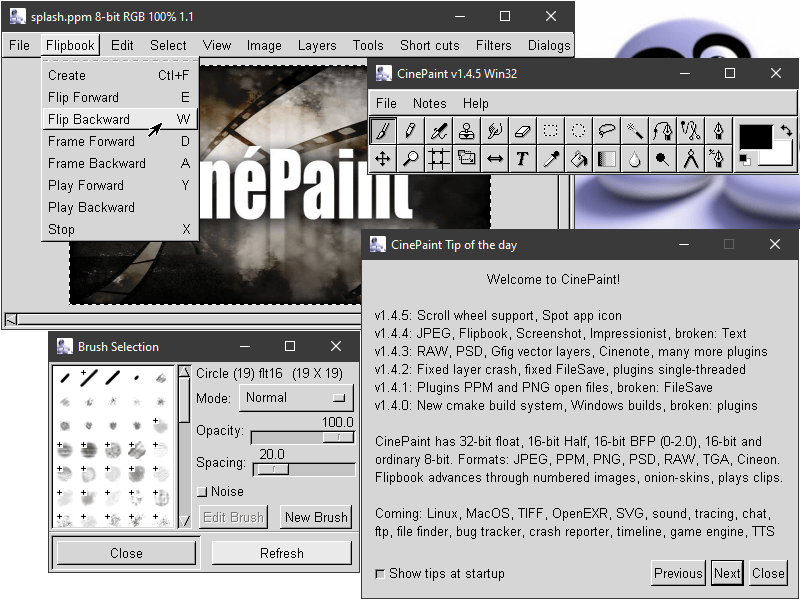
- Stable release: 1.4.5 / 30 May 2021; 5 years ago
- Written in: C, C++
- Operating system: Linux, macOS, Unix-like, Microsoft Windows
- Type: Graphics
- License: GNU General Public License 2.0
- Website: cinepaint.org
- Repository: cinepaint.cvs.sourceforge.net/cvsroot/cinepaint

CinePaint is a free and open source computer program for painting and retouching bitmap frames of films. It is a fork of version 1.0.4 of the GNU Image Manipulation Program (GIMP). It enjoyed some success as one of the earliest open source tools developed for feature motion picture visual effects and animation work. The main reason for this adoption over mainline GIMP was its support for high bit depths (greater than 8-bits per channel) which can be required for film work. The mainline GIMP project later added high bit depths in GIMP 2.9.2, released November 2015. It is free software under the GPL-2.0-or-later.

In 2018, a post titled "CinePaint 2.0 Making Progress" announced progress, but, as of 2025, version 2.0 has not been released. Development seems to have stalled entirely, as no new 1.x updates have been released since May 2021.

== Main features ==
Features that set CinePaint apart from its photo-editing predecessor include the frame manager, onion skinning, and the ability to work with 16-bit and floating point pixels for high-dynamic-range imaging (HDR). CinePaint supports a 16-bit color managed workflow for photographers and printers, including CIE*Lab and CMYK editing. It supports the Cineon, DPX, and OpenEXR image file formats. HDR creation from bracketed exposures is easy.

CinePaint is a professional open-source raster graphics editor, not a video editor. Per-channel color engine core: 8-bit, 16-bit, and 32-bit. The image formats it supports include BMP, CIN, DPX, EXR, GIF, JPEG, OpenEXR, PNG, TIFF, and XCF.

CinePaint is currently available for UNIX and Unix-like OSes including Mac OS X and IRIX. The program is available on Linux, Mac OS X, FreeBSD and NetBSD. Its main competitors are the mainline GIMP and Adobe Photoshop, although the latter is only available for Mac OS X and Microsoft Windows. Glasgow, a completely new code architecture being used for CinePaint, is expected to make a new Windows version possible and is currently under production. The Glasgow effort is FLTK based. This effort appears to have stalled.

CinePaint version 1.4.4 appeared on SourceForge on 6 May 2021, followed by CinePaint 1.4.5 on 30 May 2021.

== Movies ==
Examples of the software's application in the movie industry include:

- Elf (2003)
- Looney Tunes: Back in Action (2003)
- League of Extraordinary Gentlemen (2003)
- Duplex (2003)
- The Last Samurai (2003)
- Showtime (2002)
- Blue Crush (2002)
- 2 Fast 2 Furious (2003)
- The Harry Potter series
- Cats & Dogs (2001)
- Dr. Dolittle 2 (2001)
- Little Nicky (2000)
- The Grinch (2000)
- The 6th Day (2000)
- Stuart Little (1999)
- Planet of the Apes (2001)
- Stuart Little 2 (2002)
- Spider-Man (2002)

Under its former name Film Gimp, CinePaint was used for films such as Scooby-Doo (2002), Harry Potter and the Philosopher's Stone (2001), The Last Samurai (2003) and Stuart Little (1999).

== See also ==
- Comparison of raster graphics editors
