= Spencer Kimball (computer programmer) =

American computer programmer, entrepreneur, and business

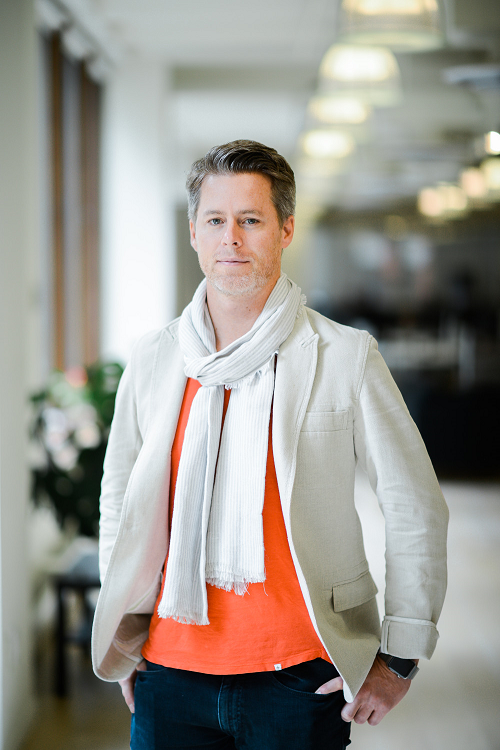
- Born: 1974 (age 51–52)
- Education: B.A., Computer Science
- Alma mater: University of California, Berkeley
- Occupation: CEO
- Employer: Cockroach Labs
- Known for: Computer Programming
- Website: Spencer Kimball on LinkedIn

Spencer Kimball is an American computer programmer, entrepreneur, and business executive. He is the CEO of Cockroach Labs, a company he co-founded in 2014. His work as a programmer includes creating the GNU Image Manipulation Program (GIMP) while still in college, and assisting the source code development of CockroachDB, the namesake software of Cockroach Labs. In addition to Cockroach Labs, Kimball was involved in the founding of other tech startups including WeGo and Viewfinder.

== Early life and education ==
Kimball was born in 1974 to a Latter-day Saint family. He attended the University of California at Berkeley. While still a student in 1995, he developed the first version of GNU Image Manipulation Program (GIMP) as a class project, along with his roommate Peter Mattis. Kimball was also a member of a student club at Berkeley called the eXperimental Computing Facility (XCF). During his time with XCF, he co-wrote the code for GIMP. Kimball said in 1999 that, "From the first line of source code to the last, GIMP was always my 'dues' paid to the free software movement. After using emacs, gcc, Linux, etc., I really felt that I owed a debt to the community which had, to a large degree, shaped my computing development." Kimball graduated with a B.A. in computer science from Berkeley in 1996.

== Career ==
After graduation, Kimball mostly ended his relationship with the GIMP development community. He co-founded WeGo, a company providing tools for building web communities, in 1998 and served as the company's co-CTO. While at XCF, he met Gene Kan, who was also a member, and the two would later begin working together on a file-sharing program for the Gnutella network, the open source Unix/Linux client gnubile. In 2000, he created a web-based version of GIMP, OnlinePhotoLab.com, that was short-lived. The technology was subsequently folded into Ofoto's online image manipulation tools.

Kimball started work with Google in Mountain View in 2002 and relocated to Google's New York offices in 2004. As one of Google's engineers, he helped spearhead Colossus, a new version of the Google File System. He also worked on the Google Servlet Engine.

In January 2012, Kimball launched the company Viewfinder along with Mattis and Brian McGinnis, formerly of Lehman Brothers. The company developed an app that allowed social media users to share photos, chat privately, and search photo history without leaving the app. The company was acquired by Square, Inc. in December 2013. Kimball moved to Square's New York City office where he became a senior member of the company's East Coast team.

While at Google, Kimball used a database known as Bigtable and followed the development of its next generation, known as Spanner. The database organizes data between thousands of servers to allow Google applications to stay online, even if an entire data center were to go offline. Kimball wanted to use this software but found there was nothing available outside of Google as either closed or open-source software with similar capabilities. He elicited the help of Mattis, along with ex-Google Reader team member Ben Darnell. They formed the company Cockroach Labs to provide commercial backing for CockroachDB, an open source project he started on GitHub in February 2014. Kimball serves as the company's chief executive officer and also contributes to the source code development of CockroachDB.
