= Colligo Contributor =

Business software package

Client for SharePoint
- Developer(s): Colligo Networks
- Stable release: 6.0 / 2013-04-16
- Operating system: Microsoft Windows
- Type: Collaboration Software
- License: Proprietary
- Website: www.colligo.com

Colligo Contributor is a proprietary software package aimed at businesses, developed by Colligo Networks of Vancouver, British Columbia. Colligo Contributor was launched in 2006 and is part of a family of Colligo products that provide rich client interfaces for Microsoft SharePoint, a collaborative portal application based on the Windows SharePoint Services platform. The Colligo for SharePoint product line also includes a free product called Colligo Reader.

Colligo Contributor is now part of Colligo Engage.

== Colligo Contributor for SharePoint ==
Colligo Contributor is a family of desktop software applications developed on the Microsoft .NET framework, that are designed to increase SharePoint user adoption by addressing "problems on the UI and user experience fronts". These applications are compatible with servers running Microsoft Office SharePoint Server 2007, SharePoint 2010, or SharePoint 2013. Colligo Contributor has been called a "client for SharePoint" because it "integrates the client infrastructure with the SharePoint infrastructure", providing a local user interface that is an alternative to the typical SharePoint interface through a browser. The architecture of the local data store enables users to optionally cache SharePoint content, making it available online and offline. Colligo Contributor also includes a software development kit to build custom SharePoint client applications, and extensions such as custom metadata editors.

Colligo contributor can be used to solve SharePoint usability challenges in several scenarios, such as email and attachment management, network file share replacement, enterprise content management, and SharePoint migration.
