= Twitterfall =

- Screenshot of Twitterfall on May 17th, 2009
- Website type: Social networking, micro-blogging
- Available in: English
- Owner: Protane LLP
- Creators: David Somers & Tom Brearley
- Website: http://www.twitterfall.com/
- Registration: Using Twitter
- Launched: January 2009
- Current status: Discontinued

Twitterfall was a UK-based website designed to allow users of the social networking site Twitter to view upcoming trends and patterns posted by users in the form of tweets. The project was founded by David Somers and Tom Brearley, computer science students at the University of York.

In February 2009, it was revealed that the site was projected onto a wall at The Daily Telegraph to allow journalists there to view breaking news posted by users to Twitter. Twitterfall gained momentum in March after The Telegraph reported on the creation of the tool. However, the paper was criticised for including an unmoderated Twitterfall stream of budget news (using hashtags) on its site, which was subsequently abused by Twitter users.

Twitterfall took advantage of Twitter's search trends (listed on the Twitter search page), which revealed topics that were most popular and discussed at that time. Twitter has become more and more important in news coverage, such as the US Airways plane crash-landing in the Hudson and the Mumbai terror attacks in 2008. In May 2009, ITV announced that they were taking advantage of Twitterfall on their site during the FA Cup Final. During the Iran election protests of 2009, Twitterfall was used to follow the events as they unfolded.

Twitterfall discontinued service January 29, 2023
