= Latent typing =

Type system where types are associated with values and not variables

In computer programming, latent typing refers to a type system where types are associated with values and not variables. An example latently typed language is Scheme. This typically requires run-time type checking and so is commonly used synonymously with dynamic typing.

== See also ==
- Duck typing
