= Flapjax =

- Paradigms: Multi-paradigm: event-driven, reactive, dataflow, functional, imperative, object-oriented (prototype-based)
- Designed by: Leo Meyerovich, Arjun Guha, Jacob Baskin, Gregory Cooper, Michael Greenberg, Aleks Bromfield, Shriram Krishnamurthi
- First appeared: 2006; 20 years ago
- Stable release: 2.1 / 2 November 2009; 16 years ago
- Typing discipline: Dynamic, duck
- Implementation language: JavaScript
- Platform: Web browser
- License: BSD 3-clause
- Website: www.flapjax-lang.org

Flapjax is a programming language built on JavaScript. It provides a spreadsheet-like reactive programming, dataflow computing style, termed functional reactive programming, making it easy to create reactive web pages without the burden of callbacks and potentially inconsistent mutation. Flapjax can be viewed in two ways: either as a library, for use in regular JavaScript programs, or as a new language that the compiler converts into generic JavaScript. In either case, the resulting programs can be run in a regular web browser. Flapjax comes with persistent storage and a simple application programming interface (API) that masks the complexity of using Ajax, and sharing and access control (AC) for server data.

It is free and open-source software released under a 3-clause BSD license.

The Flapjax compiler is written in the language Haskell.
