= Teach Yourself Scheme in Fixnum Days =

Educational book on programming in Scheme

Teach Yourself Scheme in Fixnum Days is an introductory book by Dorai Sitaram on the Scheme programming language using the Racket Scheme implementation. It is intended as a quick-start guide for novices. It works as a concise tutorial of the Scheme language.

The text is outdated in several parts, including its introduction to macros using an unhygienic macro system.
