= Daniel P. Friedman =

American computer science academic

Daniel Paul Friedman
- Born: 1944 (age 81–82)
- Education: University of Houston
- Known for: Programming Languages
- Notable work: The Little Schemer, Essentials of Programming Languages, The Little Prover
- Scientific career
- Fields: Computer Science
- Workplaces: Indiana University

Daniel Paul Friedman (born 1944) is a professor emeritus of Computer Science at Indiana University in Bloomington, Indiana. His research focuses on programming languages, and he is a prominent author in the field.

With David Wise, Friedman wrote a highly influential paper on lazy programming, specifically on lazy streams (ICALP 1976). The paper, entitled "Cons should not evaluate its arguments," is one of the first publications pushing for the exploration of a programming style with potentially infinite data structures and a form of programming that employs no computational effects (though programs may diverge). Over the 1970s, Friedman and Wise explored the topic in depth and also considered extensions to the world of parallel computing.

In the 1980s, Friedman turned to the study of the Scheme programming language. He explored the use of macros for defining programming languages; with Eugene Kohlbecker, Matthias Felleisen, and Bruce Duba, he co-introduced the notion of hygienic macros in a 1986 LFP paper that is still widely cited today. With Christopher T. Haynes and Mitchell Wand, he simultaneously studied the nature of continuation objects, their uses, and the possibilities of constraining them. Following that, Friedman and Felleisen introduced a lambda calculus with continuations and control operators.

== Books ==
Daniel P. Friedman is the author or co-author of the following books:

- The Little Lisper
- The Little Schemer
- The Little MLer
- A Little Java, A Few Patterns
- The Seasoned Schemer
- The Reasoned Schemer
- The Little Prover
- Essentials of Programming Languages
- Scheme and the Art of Programming
- Coordinated Computing: Tools and Techniques for Distributed Software
- The Little Typer
- The Little Learner
