= Dr Scheme =

Dr Scheme is a Scheme (programming language) dialect of Digital Research, Inc.

Dr Scheme may also refer to:

- DrScheme, an IDE of Racket (programming language).
