= Erik Meijer =

Erik Meijer may refer to:

- Erik Meijer (politician) (born 1944), Dutch politician
- Erik Meijer (computer scientist) (born 1963), Dutch computer scientist
- Erik Meijer (footballer) (born 1969), Dutch soccer player
