= Erik Meijer (computer scientist) =

Dutch computer scientist (born 1963)

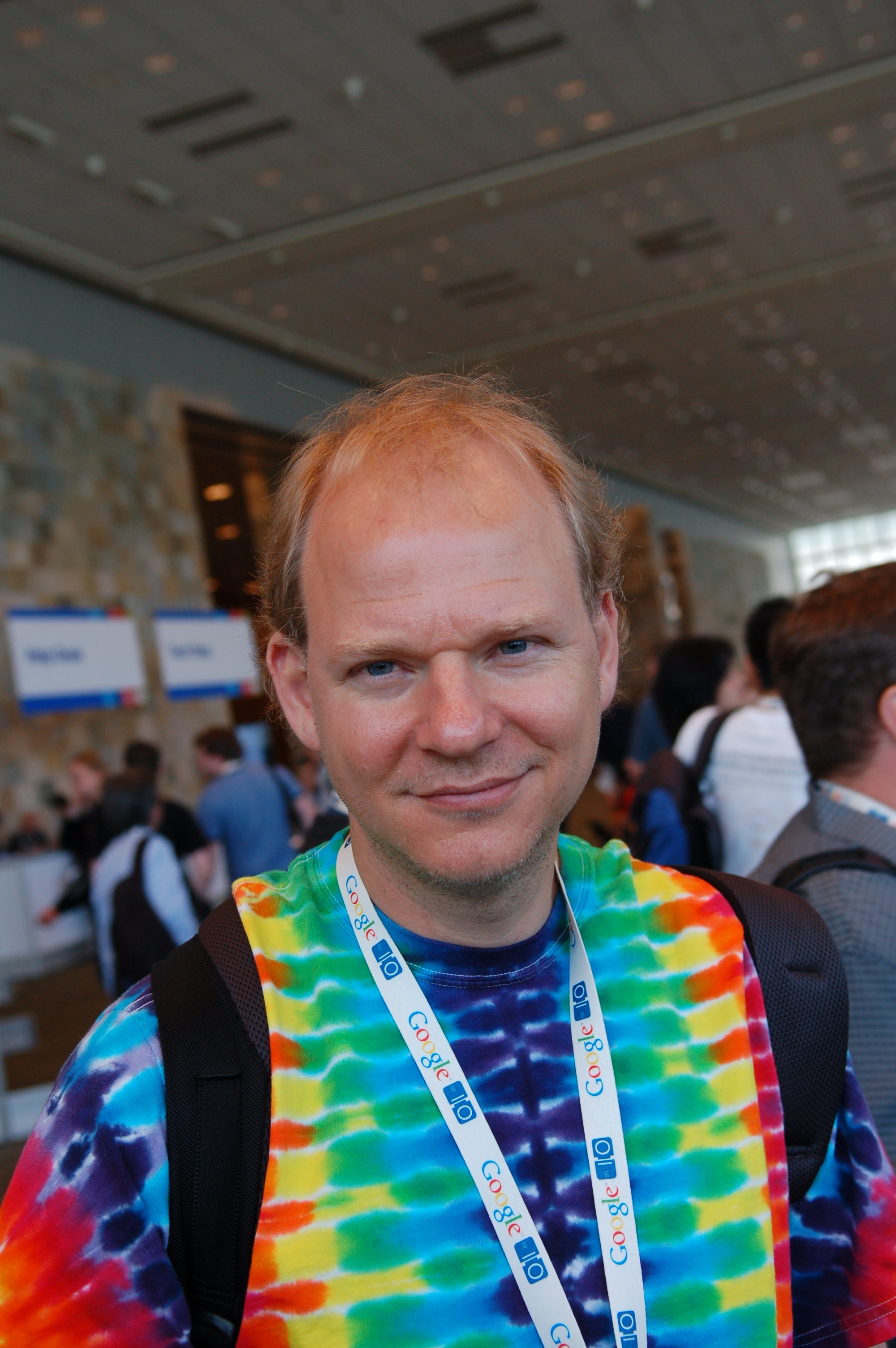
- Meijer in 2009
- Born: 18 April 1963 (age 62); Curaçao
- Education: Nijmegen University, Ph.D., 1992
- Known for: Functional programming Haskell language research Work on: C#, Visual Basic .NET, LINQ, Volta, reactive programming framework (ReactiveX) for .NET Framework
- Awards: Microsoft: Outstanding Technical Achievement, 2007; Outstanding Technical Leadership, 2009
- Scientific career
- Fields: Computer science, functional programming
- Institutions: Utrecht University; Microsoft; Facebook; Delft University of Technology; University of Nottingham; Applied Duality Inc.

Erik Meijer (born 18 April 1963, Curaçao) is a Dutch computer scientist and entrepreneur. From 2000 to early 2013, he was a software architect for Microsoft where he headed the Cloud Programmability Team. He then founded Applied Duality Inc. in 2013. Before that, he was an associate professor at Utrecht University. From 2015 to 2024, he was a Senior Director of Engineering at Facebook (now Meta) and subsequently stated, after leaving, that there is "no advantage to be inside a large corp if you want to build cool stuff on top of LLMs (Large Language Models)."

== Early life and education ==
Meijer lived in the Netherlands Antilles until the age of 14 when his father retired from his job and the family moved back to the Netherlands. He received his Ph.D. from Nijmegen University (now Radboud University) in 1992.

== Professional contributions ==
Meijer's research has included the areas of functional programming (particularly Haskell) compiler implementation, parsing, programming language design, XML, and foreign function interfaces.

His work at Microsoft included C#, Visual Basic, LINQ, Volta, and the reactive programming framework (Reactive Extensions) for the .NET Framework.

In 2009, he was the recipient of the Microsoft Outstanding Technical Leadership Award and in 2007, the Outstanding Technical Achievement Award as a member of the C# team.

In 2011, Erik Meijer was appointed part-time professor of Cloud Programming within the Software Engineering Research Group at Delft University of Technology. He is also member of the ACM Queue Editorial Board. Since 2013, he is also Honorary Professor of Programming Language Design at the School of Computer Science of the University of Nottingham, associated with the Functional Programming Laboratory.

In early 2013, Erik Meijer left Microsoft and started Applied Duality Incorporated. During this period he worked on the Hack language with Facebook, RxJava library with Netflix, and the Dart language with Google.

On Christmas 2014, Erik Meijer was diagnosed with chronic myelogenous leukemia and suffered a near-death experience for which he was hospitalized.

He teaches a course on the MOOC provider Coursera, called "Principles of Reactive Programming", and a course on edX called "Introduction to Functional Programming".

Since 2020, Meijer has been a member of the Steering Committee for the International Workshop on Cloud Intelligence / AIOps in conjunction with the ICSE, ASPLOS, MLSys, AAAI annual conferences.

== Books ==
- Advanced Functional Programming: First International Spring School on Advanced Functional Programming Techniques (Springer, 1995)
- Handbook of Multilevel Analysis (Springer, 2008)
- The Dart Programming Language (Addison-Wesley Professional, 2015)
- Reactive Programming with RxJava: Creating Asynchronous, Event-Based Applications (2016)
