= Syntactic closure =

Computer science concept

In computer science, syntactic closures are an implementation strategy for a hygienic macro system. The term pertains to the Scheme programming language.

When a syntactic closure is used the arguments to a macro call are enclosed in the current environment, such that they cannot inadvertently reference bindings introduced by the macro itself.
