= Robert Bruce Findler =

American computer scientist

Robert Bruce Findler, colloquially known as "Robby", is an American computer scientist, currently, a professor of computer science at Northwestern University. He is also a member of the PLT group and, as such, responsible for the creation and maintenance of DrRacket. In addition to DrRacket, Findler has contributed numerous components to Racket and helps manage its release process. Findler is also a leading team member of the ProgramByDesign project.

Findler received his PhD at Rice University under the direction of Matthias Felleisen. His dissertation was on the linguistics of software contracts, popularly known as design by contract. His work on software contracts provides a more careful accounting of blame, thereby helping programmers quickly home in on the faulty part of a software system.

In addition to DrRacket and software contracts, Findler focuses on the design and implementation of a workbench for semantics engineers. This workbench, called Redex, is a tool for specifying and executing the reduction semantics of a programming language. It is used by programming language researchers in the US and Europe. Most recently, SUN's Fortress research team used Redex to specify and explore key parts of their language.

Findler served as the semantics editor of the Revised^6 Report on the Scheme programming language. He and his PhD student Jacob Matthews developed a Redex model of the core semantics, which is included as an appendix of the report. The appendix plays the same role as Standard ML's formal specification (Milner, Tofte, Harper, MacQueen) but is executable and thus can visualize individual examples.

== Awards ==
In 2018, he and others were awarded the SIGPLAN Programming Languages Software Award for their work on Racket

In 2012, he and Matthias Felleisen were awarded the Most Influential ICFP Paper Award for their work on contracts
