= Mitchell Wand =

American computer scientist

Mitchell Wand is a computer science professor at Northeastern University. He received his Ph.D. from Massachusetts Institute of Technology. His research has centred on programming languages and he is a member of the Northeastern Programming Research Lab. He is also the co-author, with Daniel P. Friedman and Christopher T. Haynes, of Essentials of Programming Languages.
