= Shriram Krishnamurthi =

Professor Shriram Krishnamurthi Ph.D.
- Education: Ohio Wesleyan University; Rice University
- Known for: Racket, debugger, FrTime, networking library Flapjax
- Awards: SIGPLAN 2012 Robin Milner Young Researcher Award; SIGSOFT Influential Educator Award
- Scientific career
- Fields: Computer science Computer literacy
- Institutions: Brown University
- Doctoral advisor: Matthias Felleisen
- Website: cs.brown.edu/~sk/

Shriram Krishnamurthi is a computer scientist, currently a professor of computer science at Brown University and a member of the core development group for the Racket programming languages, responsible for creation of software packages including the Debugger, the FrTime package, and the networking library. Since 2006, Krishnamurthi has been a leading contributor to the Bootstrap curriculum, a project to integrate computer science education into grades 6–12.

Krishnamurthi received his Ph.D. at Rice University in 2000, under the direction of Matthias Felleisen. His dissertation is on linguistic reuse and macro systems in the presence of first-class modules. Starting from this topic, Krishnamurthi has moved into software engineering and is working on topics such as access control, modularization of verification, web-based interactive programming, and more. His most recent effort is a time-oriented programming language, named Flapjax, in support of asynchronous web programming. Krishnamurthi also authored a textbook on programming language design.

Krishnamurthi has won several awards. In 2012, he became the inaugural winner of the SIGPLAN Robin Milner Young Researcher Award, given by the Association for Computing Machinery's (ACM) Special Interest Group on Programming Languages (SIGPLAN) to a researcher whose research career began within 20 years of the nomination date. The award citation describes Krishnamurthi as "a prolific researcher who brings programming language theory to bear in many other disciplines, thus exposing its foundational value". He also won the SIGSOFT Influential Educator Award.
