= Matthew Flatt =

American computer scientist

Matthew Flatt is an American computer scientist and professor at the University of Utah School of Computing in Salt Lake City. He is also the leader of the core development team for the Racket programming language.

Flatt received his PhD at Rice University in 1999, under the direction of Matthias Felleisen. His dissertation is on the mechanics of first-class modules and mixin classes. His work triggered research in the ML community on mutually recursive modules and in the object-oriented community on mixins and traits.

Flatt served as one of four editors of the Revised^6 Report on the Scheme programming language. The report is influenced by his design of Racket, especially the module system, the exception system, the record system, the macro system, and library links.

In 2014, Flatt was elected an ACM Distinguished Member. In 2018, Flatt received the ACM SIGPLAN's Programming Languages Software Award (jointly with the Racket core team). The citation highlights Racket's singular significance both in research and education. The research part refers to its powerful macro system, which is integrated with its novel module system. Other impacts, for example cited in the Revised^6 Report on Scheme, concern Racket's exception system and its resource management subsystem. The education aspect is about the TeachScheme! (also known as Program by Design) project, which over decades morphed into the Bootstrap curriculum.
