= History of Python =

History of the Python programming language

Old Python logo, 1990s–2006

New Python logo, 2006–present

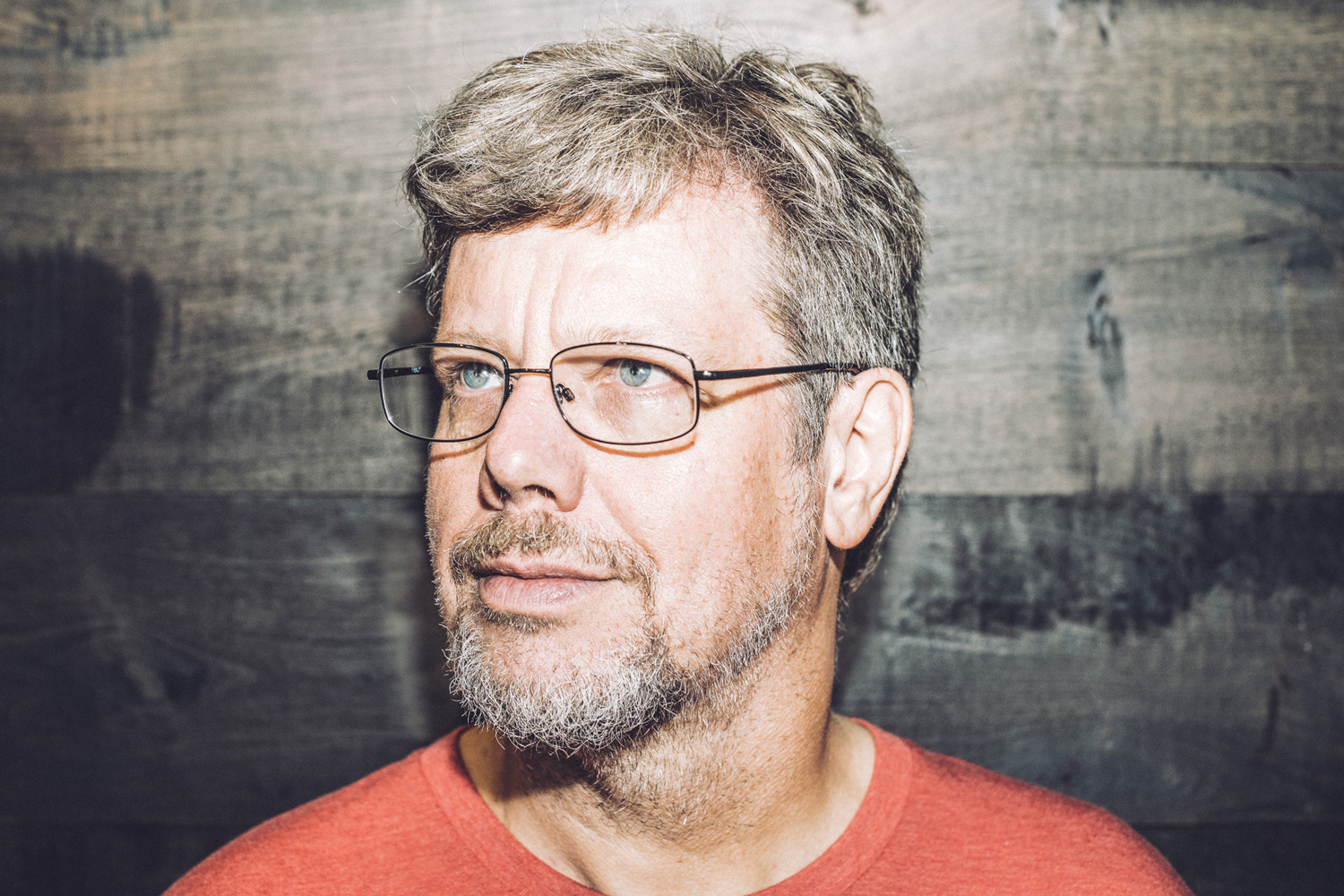
Guido van Rossum in 2014

The programming language Python was conceived in the late 1980s, and its implementation was started in December 1989 by Guido van Rossum at CWI in the Netherlands as a successor to ABC capable of exception handling and interfacing with the Amoeba operating system. Van Rossum was Python's principal author and had a central role in deciding the direction of Python (as reflected in the title given to him by the Python community, Benevolent Dictator for Life (BDFL)) until stepping down as leader on July 12, 2018. Python was named after the BBC TV show Monty Python's Flying Circus.

Python 2.0 was released on October 16, 2000, with many major new features, such as list comprehensions, cycle-detecting garbage collector, reference counting, memory management and support for Unicode, along with a change to the development process itself, with a shift to a more transparent and community-backed process.

Python 3.0, a major, backwards-incompatible release, was released on December 3, 2008 after a long period of testing. Many of its major features were also backported to the backwards-compatible Python versions 2.6 and 2.7 until support for Python 2 finally ceased at the beginning of 2020. Releases of Python 3 up through 3.12 include the 2to3 utility, which automates the translation of Python 2 code to Python 3.

As of October 2026, Python 3.15 is the latest stable release. This version currently receives full bug-fix and security updates, while Python 3.14—released in October 2025—will continue to receive bug-fixes until October 2027, and after that will only receive security fixes until its end-of-life in 2030. Python 3.11 is the oldest supported branch of Python (albeit in the 'security support' phase).

== Early history ==
Van Rossum first published the code (for Python version 0.9.1) to alt.sources in February 1991. Several features of the language were already present at this stage, among them classes with inheritance, exception handling, functions, and various core datatypes such as list, dict, and str. The initial release also contained a module system borrowed from Modula-3; Van Rossum describes the module as "one of Python's major programming units". Python's exception model also resembled Modula-3's, with the addition of an else clause. In 1994 comp.lang.python, the primary discussion forum for Python, was formed.

== Version 1 ==
Python reached version 1.0 in January 1994. The major new features included in this release were the functional programming tools lambda, map, filter and reduce. Van Rossum stated that "Python acquired lambda, reduce(), filter() and map(), courtesy of a Lisp hacker who missed them and submitted working patches".

The last version released while Van Rossum was at CWI was Python 1.2. In 1995, Van Rossum continued his work on Python at the Corporation for National Research Initiatives (CNRI) in Reston, Virginia from where he released several versions.

By version 1.4, Python had acquired several new features. Notable among these are the Modula-3 inspired keyword arguments (which are also similar to Common Lisp's keyword arguments) and built-in support for complex numbers. Also included is a basic form of data hiding by name mangling, though this is easily bypassed.

During Van Rossum's stay at CNRI, he launched the Computer Programming for Everybody (CP4E) initiative, intending to make programming more accessible to more people, with a basic "literacy" in programming languages, similar to the basic English literacy and mathematics skills required by most employers. Python served a central role in this: because of its focus on clean syntax, it was already suitable, and CP4E's goals bore similarities to its predecessor, ABC. The project was funded by DARPA. As of 2007, the CP4E project is inactive, and while Python attempts to be easily learnable and not too arcane in its syntax and semantics, outreach to non-programmers is not an active concern.

=== BeOpen ===
In 2000, the Python core development team moved to BeOpen.com to form the BeOpen PythonLabs team. CNRI requested that a version 1.6 be released, summarizing Python's development up to the point at which the development team left CNRI. Consequently, the release schedules for 1.6 and 2.0 had a significant amount of overlap. Python 2.0 was the only release from BeOpen.com. After Python 2.0 was released by BeOpen.com, Guido van Rossum and the other PythonLabs developers joined Digital Creations.

The Python 1.6 release included a new CNRI license that was substantially longer than the CWI license that had been used for earlier releases. The new license included a clause stating that the license was governed by the laws of the State of Virginia. The Free Software Foundation argued that the choice-of-law clause was incompatible with the GNU General Public License. BeOpen, CNRI and the FSF negotiated a change to Python's free-software license that would make it GPL-compatible. Python 1.6.1 is essentially the same as Python 1.6, with a few minor bug fixes, and with the new GPL-compatible license.

== Version 2 ==
Python 2.0, released October 2000, introduced list comprehensions, a feature borrowed from the functional programming languages SETL and Haskell. Python's syntax for this construct is very similar to Haskell's, apart from Haskell's preference for punctuation characters and Python's preference for alphabetic keywords. Python 2.0 also introduced a garbage collector able to collect reference cycles.

Python 2.1 was close to Python 1.6.1, as well as Python 2.0. Its license was renamed Python Software Foundation License. All code, documentation and specifications added, from the time of Python 2.1's alpha release on, is owned by the Python Software Foundation (PSF), a nonprofit organization formed in 2001, modeled after the Apache Software Foundation. The release included a change to the language specification to support nested scopes, like other statically scoped languages. (The feature was turned off by default, and not required, until Python 2.2.)

Python 2.2 was released in December 2001; a major innovation was the unification of Python's types (types written in C) and classes (types written in Python) into one hierarchy. This single unification made Python's object model purely and consistently object oriented. Also added were generators which were inspired by Icon.

Historic Python logos used on Windows (left) and the Macintosh (center), and the logo used since version 2.5 (right).

Python 2.5 was released in September 2006 and introduced the with statement, which encloses a code block within a context manager (for example, acquiring a lock before the block of code is run and releasing the lock afterwards, or opening a file and then closing it), allowing resource acquisition is initialization (RAII)-like behavior and replacing a common try/finally idiom.

Python 2.6 was released to coincide with Python 3.0, and included some features from that release, as well as a "warnings" mode that highlighted the use of features that were removed in Python 3.0. Similarly, Python 2.7 coincided with and included features from Python 3.1, which was released on June 26, 2009. Parallel 2.x and 3.x releases then ceased, and Python 2.7 was the last release in the 2.x series. In November 2014, it was announced that Python 2.7 would be supported until 2020, but users were encouraged to move to Python 3 as soon as possible. Python 2.7 support ended on January 1, 2020, along with code freeze of 2.7 development branch. A final release, 2.7.18, occurred on April 20, 2020, and included fixes for critical bugs and release blockers. This marked the end-of-life of Python 2.

== Version 3 ==
Python 3.0 (also called "Python 3000" or "Py3K") was released on December 3, 2008. It was designed to rectify fundamental design flaws in the language – the changes required could not be implemented while retaining full backwards compatibility with the 2.x series, which necessitated a new major version number. The guiding principle of Python 3 was: "reduce feature duplication by removing old ways of doing things".

Python 3.0 was developed with the same philosophy as in prior versions. However, as Python had accumulated new and redundant ways to program the same task, Python 3.0 had an emphasis on removing duplicative constructs and modules, in keeping with the Zen of Python: "There should be one— and preferably only one —obvious way to do it".

Nonetheless, Python 3.0 remained a multi-paradigm language. Coders could still follow object-oriented, structured, and functional programming paradigms, among others, but within such broad choices, the details were intended to be more obvious in Python 3.0 than they were in Python 2.x.

=== Compatibility ===
Python 3.0 broke backward compatibility, and much Python 2 code does not run unmodified on Python 3. Python's dynamic typing combined with the plans to change the semantics of certain methods of dictionaries, for example, made perfect mechanical translation from Python 2.x to Python 3.0 very difficult. A tool called "2to3" does the parts of translation that can be done automatically. At this, 2to3 appeared to be fairly successful, though an early review noted that there were aspects of translation that such a tool would never be able to handle. Prior to the roll-out of Python 3, projects requiring compatibility with both the 2.x and 3.x series were recommended to have one source (for the 2.x series), and produce releases for the Python 3.x platform using 2to3. Edits to the Python 3.x code were discouraged for so long as the code needed to run on Python 2.x. This is no longer recommended; as of 2012 the preferred approach was to create a single code base that can run under both Python 2 and 3 using compatibility modules.

=== Features ===
Some of the major changes included for Python 3.0 were:

- Changing print so that it is a built-in function, not a statement. This made it easier to change a module to use a different print function, as well as making the syntax more regular. In Python 2.6 and 2.7 print() is available as a built-in but is masked by the print statement syntax, which can be disabled by entering from __future__ import print_function at the top of the file
- Removal of the Python 2 input function, and the renaming of the raw_input function to input. Python 3's input function behaves like Python 2's raw_input function, in that the input is always returned as a string rather than being evaluated as an expression
- Moving reduce (but not map or filter) out of the built-in namespace and into functools (the rationale being code that uses reduce is less readable than code that uses a for loop and accumulator variable)
- Adding support for optional function annotations that can be used for informal type declarations or other purposes
- Unifying the str and unicode types into str, representing text, and introducing a separate immutable bytes type; and a mostly corresponding mutable bytearray type, both of which represent arrays of bytes
- Removing backward-compatibility features, including old-style classes, string exceptions, and implicit relative imports
- A change in integer division functionality: in Python 2, integer division always returns an integer. For example 5 / 2 is 2; whereas in Python 3, 5 / 2 is 2.5. (In both Python 2 – 2.2 onwards – and Python 3, a separate operator exists to provide the old behavior: 5 // 2 is 2)
- Allowing non-ASCII letters to be used in identifiers, such as in smörgåsbord
- Unifying integer types int and long into one integer type: int. Python 2 int limits integers between -2147483648 and 2147483647 inclusive. Any integers outside or inside this range have an L or l suffix such as -100000000000000L, 0l

=== Subsequent releases ===
Python 3.2 defined a stable ABI, allowing extension modules to rely on functions across different Python versions.

Python 3.5 added the typing module, which allows for type hints and function signature annotation. It additionally added the async/await syntax. Furthermore, .pyo files were removed, with .pyc files representing both unoptimized and optimized bytecode.

Python 3.6 followed with async generators and async comprehensions (for lists as well as dicts and sets), as well as formatted string literals (f-strings).

Python 3.10 introduced structural pattern matching via match/case statements. Additionally it provided improved error messages which "were inspired by previous work in the PyPy interpreter" and added the | union type operator.

Python 3.11 expanded exception handling functionality. Around this version, there has been a focus on making Python faster; 3.11 is claimed to be 10–60% faster than 3.10, and 3.12 increases by an additional 5%.

Python 3.12 added the new keyword type and improved error messages.

Python 3.13 added an experimental just-in-time (JIT) compiler, the ability to disable the global interpreter lock, a new and improved interactive interpreter (REPL), and an incremental garbage collector. Starting with Python 3.13, it and later versions receive two years of full support (increased from one and a half years), followed by three years of security support; this is the same total duration of support as previously.

Python 3.14 introduced a new tail-calling interpreter as an opt-in feature, offering 3-5% better performance.

Python 3.15 will "Make UTF-8 mode default"; This mode is supported in all current Python versions, but it currently must be opted into. UTF-8 is already used by default on Windows (and other operating systems) for most purposes, but an exception is opening files. Enabling UTF-8 also makes code fully cross-platform.

==== Security ====
Security updates were expedited in 2021 and again twice in 2022. More issues were fixed in 2023 and in September 2024 (for Python versions 3.8.20 through 3.12.6)—all versions (including 2.7) had been insecure because of issues leading to possible remote code execution and web-cache poisoning.

== Table of versions ==
Releases before numbered versions:

- Implementation started – December 1989
- Internal releases at Centrum Wiskunde & Informatica – 1990

Version	Latest micro version	Release date	End of full support	End of security fixes
0.9	0.9.9	1991-02-20	1993-07-29 (Note: Date of last micro release.)	
1.0	1.0.4	1994-01-26	1994-07-14	
1.1	1.1.1	1994-10-11	1994-11-10	
1.2		1995-04-13	Unsupported	
1.3		1995-10-13	Unsupported	
1.4		1996-10-25	Unsupported	
1.5	1.5.2	1998-01-03	1999-04-13	
1.6	1.6.1	2000-09-05	2000–09	
2.0	2.0.1	2000-10-16	2001-06-22	
2.1	2.1.3	2001-04-15	2002-04-09	
2.2	2.2.3	2001-12-21	2003-05-30	
2.3	2.3.7	2003-06-29	2008-03-11	
2.4	2.4.6	2004-11-30	2008-12-19	
2.5	2.5.6	2006-09-19	2011-05-26	
2.6	2.6.9	2008-10-01	2010-08-24 (Note: Date of last non security only release.)	2013-10-29
2.7	2.7.18	2010-07-03	2020-01-01 (Note: Official support ended on 2020-01-01, but a final release of the code as it appeared on 2020-01-01 was released on 2020-04-20 as version 2.7.18.)	
3.0	3.0.1	2008-12-03	2009-06-27	
3.1	3.1.5	2009-06-27	2011-06-12	2012-04-06
3.2	3.2.6	2011-02-20	2013-05-13	2016-02-20
3.3	3.3.7	2012-09-29	2014-03-08	2017-09-29
3.4	3.4.10	2014-03-16	2017-08-09	2019-03-18
3.5	3.5.10	2015-09-13	2017-08-08	2020-09-30
3.6	3.6.15	2016-12-23	2018-12-24	2021-12-23
3.7	3.7.17	2018-06-27	2020-06-27	2023-06-27
3.8	3.8.20	2019-10-14	2021-05-03	2024-10-07
3.9	3.9.25	2020-10-05	2022-05-17	2025-10-31
3.10	3.10.22	2021-10-04	2023-04-05	2026-10-1
3.11	3.11.18	2022-10-24	2024-04-02	2027-10
3.12	3.12.16	2023-10-02	2025-04-08	2028-10
3.13	3.13.18	2024-10-07	2026-10-1	2029-10
3.14	3.14.10	2025-10-07	2027-10	2030-10
3.15	3.15.2	2026-10-09	2028-10	2031-10
3.16	3.16.0	2027-10-05	2029-10	2032-10

Legend:
Unsupported
Supported
Latest version
Preview version
Future version
Italics indicates the latest micro version of currently supported versions as of 2026-11-10.

Table notes:

== See also ==
- History of software engineering
