= Map (higher-order function) =

Computer programming function

In many programming languages, map is a higher-order function that applies a given function to each element of a collection, e.g. a list or set, returning the results in a collection of the same type. It is often called apply-to-all when considered in functional form.

The concept of a map is not limited to lists: it works for sequential containers, tree-like containers, or even abstract containers such as futures and promises.

== Examples: mapping a list ==
Suppose there is a list of integers [1, 2, 3, 4, 5] . To calculate the square of each integer, one would first define a function to square a single number (shown here in Haskell):

square x = x * x

Afterwards, call:

>>> map square [1, 2, 3, 4, 5]

which yields [1, 4, 9, 16, 25], demonstrating that map has gone through the entire list and applied the function square to each element.

=== Visual example ===
Below, is a view of each step of the mapping process for a list of integers X = [0, 5, 8, 3, 2, 1] mapping into a new list X' according to the function $f(x) = x + 1$ :

View of processing steps when applying map function on a list

The map is provided as part of the Haskell's base prelude (i.e. "standard library") and is implemented as:

map :: (a -> b) -> [a] -> [b]
map _ []       = []
map f (x : xs) = f x : map f xs

== Generalization ==
In Haskell, the polymorphic function map :: (a -> b) -> [a] -> [b] is generalized to a polytypic function fmap :: Functor f => (a -> b) -> f a -> f b, which applies to any type belonging the Functor type class.

The type constructor of lists [] can be defined as an instance of the Functor type class using the map function from the previous example:

instance Functor [] where
  fmap = map

Other examples of Functor instances include trees:

-- a simple binary tree
data Tree a = Leaf a | Fork (Tree a) (Tree a)

instance Functor Tree where  
  fmap f (Leaf x) = Leaf (f x)
  fmap f (Fork l r) = Fork (fmap f l) (fmap f r)

Mapping over a tree yields:

>>> fmap square (Fork (Fork (Leaf 1) (Leaf 2)) (Fork (Leaf 3) (Leaf 4)))
Fork (Fork (Leaf 1) (Leaf 4)) (Fork (Leaf 9) (Leaf 16))

For every instance of the Functor type class, fmap is contractually obliged to obey the functor laws:

fmap id      ≡ id              -- identity law
fmap (f . g) ≡ fmap f . fmap g -- composition law

where . denotes function composition in Haskell.

Among other uses, this allows defining element-wise operations for various kinds of collections.

=== Category-theoretic background ===
In category theory, a functor $F : C \rarr D$ consists of two maps: one that sends each object A of the category to another object F A, and one that sends each morphism $f : A \rarr B$ to another morphism $Ff : FA \rarr FB$, which acts as a homomorphism on categories (i.e. it respects the category axioms). Interpreting the universe of data types as a category Type, with morphisms being functions, then a type constructor F that is a member of the Functor type class is the object part of such a functor, and fmap :: (a -> b) -> F a -> F b is the morphism part. The functor laws described above are precisely the category-theoretic functor axioms for this functor.

Functors can also be objects in categories, with "morphisms" called natural transformations. Given two functors $F, G : C \rarr D$, a natural transformation $\eta : F \rarr G$ consists of a collection of morphisms $\eta_A : FA \rarr GA$, one for each object A of the category D, which are 'natural' in the sense that they act as a 'conversion' between the two functors, taking no account of the objects that the functors are applied to. Natural transformations correspond to functions of the form eta :: F a -> G a, where a is a universally quantified type variable – eta knows nothing about the type which inhabits a. The naturality axiom of such functions is automatically satisfied because it is a so-called free theorem, depending on the fact that it is parametrically polymorphic. For example, reverse :: List a -> List a, which reverses a list, is a natural transformation, as is flattenInorder :: Tree a -> List a, which flattens a tree from left to right, and even sortBy :: (a -> a -> Bool) -> List a -> List a, which sorts a list based on a provided comparison function.

== Optimizations ==
The mathematical basis of maps allow for a number of optimizations. The composition law ensures that both

- (map f . map g) list and
- map (f . g) list

lead to the same result; that is, $\operatorname{map}(f) \circ \operatorname{map}(g) = \operatorname{map}(f \circ g)$. However, the second form is more efficient to compute than the first form, because each map requires rebuilding an entire list from scratch. Therefore, compilers will attempt to transform the first form into the second; this type of optimization is known as map fusion and is the functional analog of loop fusion.

Map functions can be and often are defined in terms of a fold such as foldr, which means one can do a map-fold fusion: foldr f z . map g is equivalent to foldr (f . g) z.

The implementation of map above on singly linked lists is not tail-recursive, so it may build up a lot of frames on the stack when called with a large list. Many languages alternately provide a "reverse map" function, which is equivalent to reversing a mapped list, but is tail-recursive. Here is an implementation which utilizes the fold-left function.

reverseMap f = foldl (\ys x -> f x : ys) []

Since reversing a singly linked list is also tail-recursive, reverse and reverse-map can be composed to perform normal map in a tail-recursive way, though it requires performing two passes over the list.

== Language comparison ==
The map function originated in functional programming languages.

The language Lisp introduced a map function called maplist in 1959, with slightly different versions already appearing in 1958. This is the original definition for maplist, mapping a function over successive rest lists:

maplist[x;f] = [null[x] -> NIL;T -> cons[f[x];maplist[cdr[x];f]]]

The function maplist is still available in newer Lisps like Common Lisp, though functions like mapcar or the more generic map would be preferred.

Squaring the elements of a list using maplist would be written in S-expression notation like this:

(maplist (lambda (l) (sqr (car l))) '(1 2 3 4 5))

Using the function mapcar, above example would be written like this:

(mapcar (function sqr) '(1 2 3 4 5))

Today mapping functions are supported (or may be defined) in many procedural, object-oriented, and multi-paradigm languages as well: In C++'s Standard Library, it is called std::transform or std::ranges::transform, in C# (3.0)'s LINQ library, it is provided as an extension method called Select. Map is also a frequently used operation in high level languages such as ColdFusion Markup Language (CFML), Perl, Python, and Ruby; the operation is called map in all four of these languages. A collect alias for map is also provided in Ruby (from Smalltalk). Common Lisp provides a family of map-like functions; the one corresponding to the behavior described here is called mapcar (-car indicating access using the CAR operation). There are also languages with syntactic constructs providing the same functionality as the map function.

Map is sometimes generalized to accept dyadic (2-argument) functions that can apply a user-supplied function to corresponding elements from two lists. Some languages use special names for this, such as map2 or zipWith. Languages using explicit variadic functions may have versions of map with variable arity to support variable-arity functions. Map with 2 or more lists encounters the issue of handling when the lists are of different lengths. Various languages differ on this. Some raise an exception. Some stop after the length of the shortest list and ignore extra items on the other lists. Some continue on to the length of the longest list, and for the lists that have already ended, pass some placeholder value to the function indicating no value.

In languages which support first-class functions and currying, map may be partially applied to lift a function that works on only one value to an element-wise equivalent that works on an entire container; for example, map square is a Haskell function which squares each element of a list.

Map in various languages
Language	Map	Map 2 lists	Map n lists	Notes	Handling lists of different lengths
APL	func list	list1 func list2	func/ list1 list2 list3 list4	APL's array processing abilities make operations like map implicit	length error if list lengths not equal or 1
Common Lisp	(mapcar func list)	(mapcar func list1 list2)	(mapcar func list1 list2 ...)		stops after the length of the shortest list
C++	std::transform(begin, end, result, func) list | std::views::transform(result, func)	std::transform(begin1, end1, begin2, result, func) std::views::zip_transform(func, list1, list2)	std::views::zip_transform(func, list1, list2 ...)	in header <algorithm> begin, end, and result are iterators result is written starting at result	
C#	ienum.Select(func) or The select clause	ienum1.Zip(ienum2, func)		Select is an extension method ienum is an IEnumerable; Zip is introduced in .NET 4.0; Similarly in all .NET languages	stops after the shortest list ends
CFML	obj.map(func)			Where obj is an array or a structure. func receives as arguments each item's value, its index or key, and a reference to the original object.	
Clojure	(map func list)	(map func list1 list2)	(map func list1 list2 ...)		stops after the shortest list ends
D	list.map!func	zip(list1, list2).map!func	zip(list1, list2, ...).map!func		Specified to zip by StoppingPolicy: shortest, longest, or requireSameLength
Erlang	lists:map(Fun, List)	lists:zipwith(Fun, List1, List2)	zipwith3 also available		Lists must be equal length
Elixir	Enum.map(list, fun)	Enum.zip(list1, list2) |> Enum.map(fun)	List.zip([list1, list2, ...]) |> Enum.map(fun)		stops after the shortest list ends
F#	List.map func list	List.map2 func list1 list2		Functions exist for other types (Seq and Array)	Throws exception
Gleam	list.map(list, func) yielder.map(yielder, func)	list.map2(list1, list2, func) yielder.map2(yielder1, yielder2, func)			drops the extra elements of the longer list
Groovy	list.collect(func)	[list1 list2].transpose().collect(func)	[list1 list2 ...].transpose().collect(func)		
Haskell	map func list	zipWith func list1 list2	zipWithn func list1 list2 ...	n corresponds to the number of lists; predefined up to zipWith7	stops after the shortest list ends
Haxe	array.map(func) list.map(func); Lambda.map(iterable, func)				
J	func list	list1 func list2	func/ list1, list2, list3 ,: list4	J's array processing abilities make operations like map implicit	length error if list lengths not equal
Java 8+	stream.map(func)				
JavaScript 1.6; ECMAScript 5	array#map(func)	List1.map(function (elem1, i) { return func(elem1, List2[i]); })	List1.map(function (elem1, i) { return func(elem1, List2[i], List3[i], ...); })	Array#map passes 3 arguments to func: the element, the index of the element, and the array. Unused arguments can be omitted.	Stops at the end of List1, extending the shorter arrays with undefined items if needed.
Julia	map(func, list)	map(func, list1, list2)	map(func, list1, list2, ..., listN)		ERROR: DimensionMismatch
Logtalk	map(Closure, List)	map(Closure, List1, List2)	map(Closure, List1, List2, List3, ...) (up to seven lists)	Only the Closure argument must be instantiated.	Failure
Mathematica	func /@ list Map[func, list]	MapThread[func, {list1, list2}]	MapThread[func, {list1, list2, ...}]		Lists must be same length
Maxima	map(f, expr_{1}, ..., expr_{n}) maplist(f, expr_{1}, ..., expr_{n})			map returns an expression which leading operator is the same as that of the expressions; maplist returns a list	
OCaml	List.map func list Array.map func array	List.map2 func list1 list2			raises Invalid_argument exception
PARI/GP	apply(func, list)				—
Perl	map block list map expr, list			In block or expr special variable $_ holds each value from list in turn.	Helper List::MoreUtils::each_array combines more than one list until the longest one is exhausted, filling the others with undef.
PHP	array_map(callable, array)	array_map(callable, array1,array2)	array_map(callable, array1,array2, ...)	The number of parameters for callable should match the number of arrays.	extends the shorter lists with NULL items
Prolog	maplist(Cont, List1, List2).	maplist(Cont, List1, List2, List3).	maplist(Cont, List1, ...).	List arguments are input, output or both. Subsumes also zipWith, unzip, all	Silent failure (not an error)
Python	map(func, list)	map(func, list1, list2)	map(func, list1, list2, ...)	Returns a list in Python 2 and an iterator in Python 3.	zip() and map() (3.x) stops after the shortest list ends, whereas map() (2.x) and itertools.zip_longest() (3.x) extends the shorter lists with None items
Ruby	enum.collect {block} enum.map {block}	enum1.zip(enum2).map {block}	enum1.zip(enum2, ...).map {block} [enum1, enum2, ...].transpose.map {block}	enum is an Enumeration	stops at the end of the object it is called on (the first list); if any other list is shorter, it is extended with nil items
Rust	list1.into_iter().map(func)	list1.into_iter().zip(list2).map(func)		the Iterator::map and Iterator::zip methods both take ownership of the original iterator and return a new one; the Iterator::zip method internally calls the IntoIterator::into_iter method on list2	stops after the shorter list ends
S-R	lapply(list, func)	mapply(func, list1, list2)	mapply(func, list1, list2, ...)		Shorter lists are cycled
Scala	list.map(func)	(list1, list2).zipped.map(func)	(list1, list2, list3).zipped.map(func)	note: more than 3 not possible.	stops after the shorter list ends
Scheme (including Guile and Racket)	(map func list)	(map func list1 list2)	(map func list1 list2 ...)		lists must all have same length (SRFI-1 extends to take lists of different length)
Smalltalk	aCollection collect: aBlock	aCollection1 with: aCollection2 collect: aBlock			Fails
Standard ML	map func list	ListPair.map func (list1, list2); ListPair.mapEq func (list1, list2)		For 2-argument map, func takes its arguments in a tuple	ListPair.map stops after the shortest list ends, whereas ListPair.mapEq raises UnequalLengths exception
Swift	sequence.map(func)	zip(sequence1, sequence2).map(func)			stops after the shortest list ends
XPath 3 XQuery 3	list ! block for-each(list, func)	for-each-pair(list1, list2, func)		In block the context item . holds the current value	stops after the shortest list ends

== See also ==
- Functor (functional programming)
- Zipping (computer science) or zip, mapping 'list' over multiple lists
- Filter (higher-order function)
- Fold (higher-order function)
- foreach loop
- Free monoid
- Functional programming
- Higher-order function
- List comprehension
- Map (parallel pattern)
