= Zipping (computer science) =

Function which maps a tuple of sequences into a sequence of tuples

In computer science, zipping is a function which maps a tuple of sequences into a sequence of tuples. This name zip derives from the action of a zipper in that it interleaves two formerly disjoint sequences. The inverse function is unzip.

== Example ==
Given the three words cat, fish and be where |cat| is 3, |fish| is 4 and |be| is 2. Let $\ell$ denote the length of the longest word which is fish; $\ell = 4$. The zip of cat, fish, be is then 4 tuples of elements:

$$(c,f,b)(a,i,e)(t,s,\#)(\#,h,\#)$$

where # is a symbol not in the original alphabet. In Haskell this truncates to the shortest sequence $\underline{\ell}$, where $\underline{\ell} = 2$:

zip3 "cat" "fish" "be"
-- [('c','f','b'),('a','i','e')]

== Definition ==
Let Σ be an alphabet, # a symbol not in Σ.

Let x_{1}x_{2}... x_{|x|}, y_{1}y_{2}... y_{|y|}, z_{1}z_{2}... z_{|z|}, ... be n words (i.e. finite sequences) of elements of Σ. Let $\ell$ denote the length of the longest word, i.e. the maximum of |x|, |y|, |z|, ... .

The zip of these words is a finite sequence of n-tuples of elements of (Σ ∪ {#}), i.e. an element of $((\Sigma\cup\{\# \})^n)^*$:

$$(x_1,y_1,\ldots)(x_2,y_2,\ldots)\ldots(x_\ell,y_\ell,\ldots)$$,

where for any index i > |w|, the w_{i} is #.

The zip of x, y, z, ... is denoted zip(x, y, z, ...) or x ⋆ y ⋆ z ⋆ ...

The inverse to zip is sometimes denoted unzip.

A variation of the zip operation is defined by:

$$(x_1,y_1,\ldots)(x_2,y_2,\ldots)\ldots(x_{\underline{\ell}},y_{\underline{\ell}},\ldots)$$

where $\underline{\ell}$ is the minimum length of the input words. It avoids the use of an adjoined element $\#$, but destroys information about elements of the input sequences beyond $\underline{\ell}$.

== In programming languages ==
Zip functions are often available in programming languages, often referred to as zip. In Lisp-dialects one can simply map the desired function over the desired lists, map is variadic in Lisp so it can take an arbitrary number of lists as argument. An example from Clojure:

;; `nums' contains an infinite list of numbers (0 1 2 3 ...)
(def nums (range))
(def tens [10 20 30])
(def firstname "Alice")

;; To zip (0 1 2 3 ...) and [10 20 30] into a vector, invoke `map vector' on them; same with list
(map vector nums tens)           ; ⇒ ([0 10] [1 20] [2 30])
(map list nums tens)             ; ⇒ ((0 10) (1 20) (2 30))
(map str nums tens)              ; ⇒ ("010" "120" "230")

;; `map' truncates to the shortest sequence; note missing \c and \e from "Alice"
(map vector nums tens firstname) ; ⇒ ([0 10 \A] [1 20 \l] [2 30 \i])
(map str nums tens firstname)    ; ⇒ ("010A" "120l" "230i")

;; To unzip, apply `map vector' or `map list'
(apply map list (map vector nums tens firstname))
;; ⇒ ((0 1 2) (10 20 30) (\A \l \i))

In Common Lisp:

(defparameter nums '(1 2 3))
(defparameter tens '(10 20 30))
(defparameter firstname "Alice")

(mapcar #'list nums tens)
;; ⇒ ((1 10) (2 20) (3 30))

(mapcar #'list nums tens (coerce firstname 'list))
;; ⇒ ((1 10 #\A) (2 20 #\l) (3 30 #\i)) — truncates on shortest list

;; Unzips
(apply #'mapcar #'list (mapcar #'list nums tens (coerce firstname 'list)))
;; ⇒ ((1 2 3) (10 20 30) (#\A #\l #\i))

Languages such as Python provide a zip() function. zip() in conjunction with the * operator unzips a list:

>>> nums = [1, 2, 3]
>>> tens = [10, 20, 30]
>>> firstname = 'Alice'

>>> zipped = list(zip(nums, tens))
>>> zipped
[(1, 10), (2, 20), (3, 30)]

>>> list(zip(*zipped)) # unzip
[(1, 2, 3), (10, 20, 30)]

>>> zipped2 = list(zip(nums, tens, list(firstname)))
>>> zipped2 # zip, truncates on shortest
[(1, 10, 'A'), (2, 20, 'l'), (3, 30, 'i')] 
>>> list(zip(*zipped2)) # unzip
[(1, 2, 3), (10, 20, 30), ('A', 'l', 'i')]

Haskell has a method of zipping sequences but requires a specific function for each arity (zip for two sequences, zip3 for three etc.), similarly the functions unzip and unzip3 are available for unzipping:

-- nums contains an infinite list of numbers [1, 2, 3, ...] 
nums = [1..]
tens = [10, 20, 30]
firstname = "Alice"

zip nums tens
-- ⇒ [(1,10), (2,20), (3,30)] — zip, truncates infinite list
unzip $ zip nums tens
-- ⇒ ([1,2,3], [10,20,30]) — unzip

zip3 nums tens firstname
-- ⇒ [(1,10,'A'), (2,20,'l'), (3,30,'i')] — zip, truncates
unzip3 $ zip3 nums tens firstname
-- ⇒ ([1,2,3], [10,20,30], "Ali") — unzip

== Language comparison ==
List of languages by support of zip:

Zip in various languages
Language	Zip	Zip 3 lists	Zip n lists	Notes
Chapel	zip (iter1 iter2)	zip (iter1 iter2 iter3)	zip (iter1 ... itern)	The shape of each iterator, the rank and the extents in each dimension, must be identical.
Clojure	(map list list1 list2) (map vector list1 list2)	(map list list1 list2 list3) (map vector list1 list2 list3)	(map list list1 … listn) (map vector list1 … listn)	Stops after the length of the shortest list.
Common Lisp	(mapcar #'list list1 list2)	(mapcar #'list list1 list2 list3)	(mapcar #'list list1 ... listn)	Stops after the length of the shortest list.
D	zip(range1, range2) range1.zip(range2)	zip(range1, range2,range3) range1.zip(range2, range3)	zip(range1, …, rangeN) range1.zip(…, rangeN)	The stopping policy defaults to shortest and can be optionally provided as shortest, longest, or requiring the same length. The second form is an example of UFCS.
F#	List.zip list1 list2 Seq.zip source1 source2 Array.zip array1 array2	List.zip3 list1 list2 list3 Seq.zip3 source1 source2 source3 Array.zip3 array1 array2 array3		
Haskell	zip list1 list2	zip3 list1 list2 list3	zipn list1 … listn	zipn for n > 3 is available in the module Data.List. Stops after the shortest list ends.
Python	zip(list1, list2)	zip(list1, list2, list3)	zip(list1, …, listn)	zip() and map() (3.x) stops after the shortest list ends, whereas map() (2.x) and itertools.zip_longest() (3.x) extends the shorter lists with None items
Ruby	list1.zip(list2)	list1.zip(list2, list3)	list1.zip(list1, .., listn)	When the list being executed upon (list1) is shorter than the lists being zipped the resulting list is the length of list1. If list1 is longer nil values are used to fill the missing values
Scala	list1.zip(list2)			If one of the two collections is longer than the other, its remaining elements are ignored.

Unzip in various languages
Language	Unzip	Unzip 3 tuples	Unzip n tuples	Notes
Clojure	(apply map vector ziplist)	(apply map vector ziplist)	(apply map vector ziplist)	
Common Lisp	(apply #'mapcar #'list ziplist)	(apply #'mapcar #'list ziplist)	(apply #'mapcar #'list ziplist)	
F#	List.unzip list1 list2 Seq.unzip source1 source2 Array.unzip array1 array2	List.unzip3 list1 list2 list3 Seq.unzip3 source1 source2 source3 Array.unzip3 array1 array2 array3		
Haskell	unzip ziplist	unzip3 ziplist	unzipn ziplist	unzipn for n > 3 is available in the module Data.List.
Python	zip(*zipvlist)	zip(*zipvlist)	zip(*zipvlist)	

== See also ==
- Map (higher-order function)
