= Repeat loop =

Repeat loop may refer to:

- For loop – Commonly known as the repeat (x) { ... } loop.
- Do while loop – Known as the repeat { ... } until (!CONDITION) loop.
- Infinite loop – Known as the repeat forever { ... } loop.
