= List comprehension =

Syntactic construct for creating a list based on existing lists

A list comprehension is a syntactic construct available in some programming languages for creating a list based on existing lists. It follows the form of the mathematical set-builder notation (set comprehension) as distinct from the use of map and filter functions.

== Overview ==
Consider the following example in mathematical set-builder notation.

$$S=\{2\cdot x\mid x \in \mathbb{N},\ x^2>3\}$$

or often

$$S=\{2\cdot x : x \in \mathbb{N},\ x^2>3\}$$

This can be read, "$S$ is the set of all numbers "2 times $x$" SUCH THAT $x$ is an ELEMENT or MEMBER of the set of natural numbers ($\mathbb{N}$), AND $x$ squared is greater than $3$."

The smallest natural number, x = 1, fails to satisfy the condition x^{2}>3 (the condition 1^{2}>3 is false) so 2 ·1 is not included in S. The next natural number, 2, does satisfy the condition (2^{2}>3) as does every other natural number. Thus x consists of 2, 3, 4, 5... Since the set S consists of all numbers "2 times x" it is given by S = {4, 6, 8, 10,...}. S is, in other words, the set of all even numbers greater than 2.

In this annotated version of the example:

$$S=\{\underbrace{2\cdot x}_{\color{Violet}{\text{output expression}}}\mid \underbrace{x}_{\color{Violet}{\text{variable}}} \in \underbrace{\mathbb{N}}_{\color{Violet}{\text{input set}}},\ \underbrace{x^2>3}_{\color{Violet}{\text{predicate}}}\}$$

- $x$ is the variable representing members of an input set.
- $\mathbb{N}$ represents the input set, which in this example is the set of natural numbers
- $x^2>3$ is a predicate expression acting as a filter on members of the input set.
- $2\cdot x$ is an output expression producing members of the new set from members of the input set that satisfy the predicate expression.
- $\{\}$ braces indicate that the result is a set
- $\mid$ $,$ the vertical bar is read as "SUCH THAT". The bar and the colon ":" are used interchangeably.
- commas separate the predicates and can be read as "AND".

A list comprehension has the same syntactic components to represent generation of a list in order from an input list or iterator:

- A variable representing members of an input list.
- An input list (or iterator).
- An optional predicate expression.
- And an output expression producing members of the output list from members of the input iterable that satisfy the predicate.

The order of generation of members of the output list is based on the order of items in the input.

In Haskell's list comprehension syntax, this set-builder construct would be written similarly, as:

s = [ 2*x | x <- [0..], x^2 > 3 ]

Here, the list [0..] represents $\mathbb{N}$, x^2>3 represents the predicate, and 2*x represents the output expression.

List comprehensions give results in a defined order (unlike the members of sets); and list comprehensions may generate the members of a list in order, rather than produce the entirety of the list thus allowing, for example, the previous Haskell definition of the members of an infinite list.

== History ==
The existence of related constructs predates the use of the term "List Comprehension". The SETL programming language (1969) has a set formation construct which is similar to list comprehensions. E.g., this code prints all prime numbers from 2 to N:

print([n in [2..N] | ∀ m in {2..n - 1} | n mod m > 0]);

The computer algebra system Axiom (1973) has a similar construct that processes streams.

The first use of the term "comprehension" for such constructs was in Rod Burstall and John Darlington's description of their functional programming language NPL from 1977. In his retrospective "Some History of Functional Programming Languages", David Turner recalls:

NPL was implemented in POP2 by Burstall and used for Darlington’s work on program transformation (Burstall & Darlington 1977). The language was first order, strongly (but not polymorphically) typed, purely functional, call-by-value. It also had "set expressions" e.g.,

setofeven (X)  <=  <:x : x in X & even(x):>}}

In a footnote attached to the term "list comprehension", Turner also notes:

I initially called these ZF expressions, a reference to Zermelo–Fraenkel set theory – it was Phil Wadler who coined the better term list comprehension.

Burstall and Darlington's work with NPL influenced many functional programming languages during the 1980s, but not all included list comprehensions. An exception was Turner's influential, pure, lazy, functional programming language Miranda, released in 1985. The subsequently developed standard pure lazy functional language Haskell includes many of Miranda's features, including list comprehensions.

Comprehensions were proposed as a query notation for databases and were implemented in the Kleisli database query language.

== Similar constructs ==
=== Monad comprehension ===
In Haskell, a monad comprehension is a generalization of the list comprehension to other monads in functional programming.

=== Set comprehension ===
The Python language introduces syntax for set comprehensions starting in version 2.7. Similar in form to list comprehensions, set comprehensions generate Python sets instead of lists.

s: set[str] = {v for v in "ABCDABCD" if v not in "CB"}
print(s)
# prints {'A', 'D'}
print(type(s))
# prints <class 'set'>

Racket set comprehensions generate Racket sets instead of lists.

(for/set ([v "ABCDABCD"] #:unless (member v (string->list "CB")))
         v))

=== Dictionary comprehension ===
The Python language introduced a new syntax for dictionary comprehensions in version 2.7, similar in form to list comprehensions but which generate Python dicts instead of lists.

s: dict[str] = {key: val for key, val in enumerate("ABCD") if val not in "CB"}
print(s)
# prints {0: 'A', 3: 'D'}

Racket hash table comprehensions generate Racket hash tables (one implementation of the Racket dictionary type).

(for/hash ([(val key) (in-indexed "ABCD")]
           #:unless (member val (string->list "CB")))
  (values key val))

=== Parallel list comprehension ===
The Glasgow Haskell Compiler has an extension named parallel list comprehension (also called zip-comprehension) that permits multiple independent branches of qualifiers within the list comprehension syntax. Whereas qualifiers separated by commas are dependent ("nested"), qualifier branches separated by pipes are evaluated in parallel (this refers to no form of multithreadedness: it merely means that the branches are zipped).

-- regular list comprehension
a = [(x,y) | x <- [1..5], y <- [3..5]]
-- [(1,3),(1,4),(1,5),(2,3),(2,4) ...

-- zipped list comprehension
b = [(x,y) | (x,y) <- zip [1..5] [3..5]]
-- [(1,3),(2,4),(3,5)]

-- parallel list comprehension
c = [(x,y) | x <- [1..5] | y <- [3..5]]
-- [(1,3),(2,4),(3,5)]

Racket's comprehensions standard library contains parallel and nested versions of its comprehensions, distinguished by "for" vs "for*" in the name. For example, the vector comprehensions "for/vector" and "for*/vector" create vectors by parallel versus nested iteration over sequences. The following is Racket code for the Haskell list comprehension examples.

> (for*/list ([x (in-range 1 6)] [y (in-range 3 6)]) (list x y))
'((1 3) (1 4) (1 5) (2 3) (2 4) (2 5) (3 3) (3 4) (3 5) (4 3) (4 4) (4 5) (5 3) (5 4) (5 5))
> (for/list ([x (in-range 1 6)] [y (in-range 3 6)]) (list x y))
'((1 3) (2 4) (3 5))

In Python, we could do as follows:

# regular list comprehension
a: list[tuple[int, int]] = [(x, y) for x in range(1, 6) for y in range(3, 6)]
print(a)
# prints [(1, 3), (1, 4), (1, 5), (2, 3), (2, 4), ...
# parallel/zipped list comprehension
b: list[tuple[int, int]] = [x for x in zip(range(1, 6), range(3, 6))]
print(b)
# prints [(1, 3), (2, 4), (3, 5)]

In Julia, practically the same results can be achieved as follows:

# regular array comprehension
a::Vector{Tuple{Int, Int}} = [(x, y) for x in 1:5 for y in 3:5]

# parallel/zipped array comprehension
b::Vector{Tuple{Int, Int}} = [x for x in zip(1:3, 3:5)]

with the only difference that instead of lists, in Julia, we have arrays.

=== XQuery and XPath ===
Like the original NPL use, these are fundamentally database access languages.

This makes the comprehension concept more important, because it is computationally infeasible to retrieve the entire list and operate on it (the initial 'entire list' may be an entire Extensible Markup Language (XML) database).

In XPath, the expression:

/library/book//paragraph[@style='first-in-chapter']

is conceptually evaluated as a series of "steps" where each step produces a list and the next step applies a filter function to each element in the previous step's output.

In XQuery, full XPath is available, but FLWOR statements are also used, which is a more powerful comprehension construct.

for $b in //book
where $b[@pages < 400]
order by $b//title
return
  <shortBook>
    <title>{$b//title}</title>
    <firstPara>{($book//paragraph)[1]}</firstPara>
  </shortBook>

Here the XPath //book is evaluated to create a sequence (aka list); the where clause is a functional "filter", the order by sorts the result, and the <shortBook>...</shortBook> XML snippet is actually an anonymous function that builds/transforms XML for each element in the sequence using the 'map' approach found in other functional languages.

So, in another functional language the above FLWOR statement may be implemented like this:

map(
  newXML(shortBook, newXML(title, $1.title), newXML(firstPara, $1...))
  filter(
    lt($1.pages, 400),
    xpath(//book)
  )
)

=== LINQ in C# ===
C# 3.0 has a group of related features named Language Integrated Query (LINQ), which defines a set of query operators for manipulating object enumerations.

using System.Collections.Generic;
using System.Linq;

IEnumerable<int> s = Enumerable.Range(0, 100).Where(x => x * x > 3).Select(x => x * 2);

It also offers an alternative comprehension syntax, reminiscent of Structured Query Language (SQL):

using System.Collections.Generic;
using System.Linq;

IEnumerable<int> s = from x in Enumerable.Range(0, 100) where x * x > 3 select x * 2;

LINQ provides an ability over typical list comprehension implementations. When the root object of the comprehension implements the IQueryable interface, rather than just executing the chained methods of the comprehension, the entire sequence of commands are converted into an abstract syntax tree (AST) object, which is passed to the IQueryable object to interpret and execute.

This enables many things, including for the IQueryable to:

- Rewrite an incompatible or inefficient comprehension
- Translate the AST into another query language (e.g., SQL) to execute

=== C++ ===
C++ has no language features directly supporting list comprehensions, but operator overloading (e.g., overloading |, >>, >>=) has been used to provide expressive syntax for "embedded" query domain-specific languages (DSL). Alternatively, list comprehensions can be constructed using the erase–remove idiom to select elements in a container and the STL algorithm for_each to transform them.

Historically, the <algorithm> header contained only iterator-based algorithms on a range of elements. This was later expanded in C++20 with the addition of constrained algorithms (in namespace std::ranges) to that header, which rather than operating over iterators, instead operate over a range.

import std;

using std::vector;

template <typename Collection, typename Pred, typename Trans>
Collection comprehend(Collection&& source, const Pred& predicate, const Trans& transformation) {
    // initialize destination
    Collection d = std::forward<Collection>(source);

    // filter elements
    d.erase(std::ranges::remove_if(d, predicate), d.end());

    // apply transformation
    std::ranges::for_each(d, transformation);

    return d;
}

int main(int argc, char* argv[]) {
    vector<int> range(10);
    // range is a list of 10 elements, all zero
    std::ranges::iota(range, 1);
    // range now contains 1, 2, ..., 10

    vector<int> result = comprehend(
        range,
        [](int x) -> bool { return x * x <= 3; },
        [](int& x) -> void { x *= 2; }
    );
    // result now contains 4, 6, ..., 20
}

In C++20, additional headers, such as <ranges>, were added, featuring composable range algorithms and lazily evaluated views over any range. Using the std::ranges::views library (also abbreviated as std::views), this can instead be written as:

using std::vector;
using std::ranges::to;
using std::views::filter;
using std::views::transform;

vector<int> range(10);
// range is a list of 10 elements, all zero
std::ranges::iota(range, 1);
// range now contains 1, 2, ..., 10

vector<int> result = range
    | filter([](int x) -> bool { return x * x > 3; })
    | transform([](int x) -> int { return x * 2; })
    | to<vector>();

=== Java ===
The Streams API introduced in Java 8 introduced a lazily evaluated range-like object, called a stream. Any type which implements the java.util.stream.Stream interface can be used with streams. These can be collected by toArray() or toList(), which accumulates the elements into an Object[] or List<T>.

import java.util.List;

List<Integer> numbers = List.of(1, 2, 3, 4, 5);
List<Integer> doubledEven = numbers.stream()
    .filter(x -> x % 2 == 0)
    .map(x -> x * 2)
    .toList();

System.out.println(doubledEven); // [4, 8]

=== Rust ===
Rust has iterators, which are lazily evaluated. Any type which implements the std::iter::Iterator trait can be used with iterators. By using the methods, a chain of iterator adapters are created, which are finally collected by collect() into an actual collection (usually Vec<T>).

let numbers = vec![1, 2, 3, 4, 5];
let doubled_even: Vec<i32> = numbers
    .iter()
    .filter(|&x| x % 2 == 0)
    .map(|x| x * 2)
    .collect();

println!("{:?}", doubled_even); // [4, 8]

== See also ==
- Set-builder notation
- The SELECT statement together with its FROM and WHERE clauses in SQL

== Notes and references ==
- List Comprehension in The Free On-line Dictionary of Computing, Editor Denis Howe.
- Wadler, Philip (1990). "Comprehending Monads". Proceedings of the 1990 ACM Conference on LISP and Functional Programming. Nice.
