= Daniel Weinreb =

American computer programmer

Daniel L. Weinreb
- Born: January 6, 1959; New York City, United States
- Died: September 7, 2012 (aged 53); Massachusetts, United States
- Education: B.S., Massachusetts Institute of Technology (1979)
- Known for: EINE, Symbolics, Common Lisp, ObjectStore
- Spouse: Cheryl Moreau (m. 1986)
- Children: Adam Weinreb
- Scientific career
- Fields: Computer science, programming
- Institutions: LLNL; Symbolics; Object Design, Incorporated; BEA Systems; ITA Software
- Thesis: A Real-Time Display-oriented Editor for the LISP Machine (1979)

Daniel L. Weinreb (January 6, 1959 – September 7, 2012) was an American computer scientist and programmer, with significant work in the environment of the programming language Lisp.

== Early life ==
Weinreb was born on January 6, 1959, in Brooklyn, New York, and was raised there by his parents, Herbert and Phyllis Weinreb. He had two brothers, Bill and David, and attended Saint Ann's School.

== Education ==
Weinreb graduated from St. Ann's School in Brooklyn, New York in 1975. He attended the Massachusetts Institute of Technology (MIT) from 1975 to 1979 (starting at age 16), graduating with a B.S. in computer science and electrical engineering, where he and Mike McMahon wrote EINE and ZWEI, text editors for MIT Lisp machines. EINE made use of the windowing system of the Lisp machine, and thus is the first Emacs written for a graphical user interface (GUI). EINE was the second implementation of Emacs ever written, and the first implementation of Emacs in Lisp. Most of the notable subsequent Emacs implementations used Lisp, including Richard Stallman's GNU Emacs, James Gosling's Gosmacs, and Bernard Greenberg's Multics Emacs.

== Professional life ==
During 1979–1980, Weinreb worked at Lawrence Livermore National Laboratory (LLNL) on the operating system Amber for the S-1 supercomputer, more so the file system and the multiprocess scheduler.

In 1980, he cofounded Symbolics, developing software for their Lisp machine. He also participated significantly in the design of the programming language Common Lisp (CL). He was one of the five co-authors of the original language specification, Common Lisp the Language, First Edition. He worked on Statice, an object-oriented database published by Symbolics in 1988.

In 1988, he cofounded Object Design, Incorporated (ODI), where he was one of the architects and implementors of ObjectStore, a leading commercial object-oriented database management system object database. It is still commercially maintained and available from Progress Software, which bought Object Design (then eXcelon, Inc.).

In 2002, he joined BEA Systems, where he was Operations, Administration, and Management Architect for WebLogic.

In 2006, he joined ITA Software, working on an airline reservations system (ARS). In 2009 Daniel Weinreb gave a Google Tech Talk about the use of Common Lisp as one of the implementation languages for the airline reservation system. The video is no longer available for reasons Dan described as "kind of stupid".

In 2009, he was the chair of the International Lisp Conference 2009 in Cambridge, Massachusetts.

== Personal life ==
Weinreb married Cheryl Moreau in 1986 and they had a son, Adam, in 1991.

Dan Weinreb died on September 7, 2012, after a year-long battle with cancer.

== Publications ==
- Bawden, Alan; Greenblatt, Richard; Holloway, Jack; Knight, Thomas; Moon, David; Weinreb, Daniel (August 1977), Lisp Machine Progress Report (PDF), Cambridge, Massachusetts: MIT Artificial Intelligence Laboratory, archived from the original (PDF) on July 6, 2017
- Weinreb, Daniel L. (January 1979). A Real-Time Display-oriented Editor for the LISP Machine, Undergraduate Thesis (Thesis). Cambridge, Massachusetts: MIT EECS Department.
- Weinreb, Daniel L.; Moon, David (January 1979). Lisp Machine Manual. Cambridge, Massachusetts: MIT Artificial Intelligence Laboratory.
- Weinreb, Daniel; Moon, David (1980), Flavors: Message Passing in the Lisp Machine (PDF), archived from the original (PDF) on July 6, 2017
- Weinreb, Daniel; Moon, David (March 1981). Lisp Machine Manual, Third Edition (PDF). Cambridge, Massachusetts: MIT Artificial Intelligence Laboratory.
- Daniel, Weinreb; Moon, David A. (October 14, 1982), Introduction to Using the Window System; Working Papers, WP-210, Cambridge, Massachusetts: MIT Artificial Intelligence Laboratory, hdl:1721.1/41207
- Stallman, Richard; Weinreb, Daniel; Moon, David (August 1983). Lisp Machine Window System Manual; Edition 1.1, System Version 95 (PDF). Cambridge, Massachusetts: MIT Artificial Intelligence Laboratory – via Bitsavers.
- Steele, Guy L. Jr.; Fahlman, S. E.; Gabriel, R. P.; Moon, D. A.; Weinreb, D. L. (1984). Common Lisp: The Language. Burlington, Massachusetts: Digital Press. ISBN 9780932376411.
- EU patent EP0113460A2, Weinreb, Daniel L.; Holloway, John T. & Moon, David A. et al., "Symbolic language data processing system", published July 18, 1984, issued July 18, 1984, assigned to Symbolics Inc.
- Greenblatt, Richard D.; Knight, Thomas F.; Weinreb, Daniel L. (January 1984). Barstow, David R.; Shrobe, Howard E.; Sandewall, Erik (eds.). The LISP Machine" in "Interactive Programming Environments. McGraw-Hill. ISBN 9780070038851.
- Weinreb, D.; Feinberg, N.; Gerson, D.; Lamb, C. (1988). "An object-oriented database system to support an integrated programming environment". Data Engineering Bulletin.
- Lamb, Charles; Landis, Gordon; Orenstein, Jack; Weinreb, Daniel (October 1991). "The ObjectStore Database System". Communications of the ACM. 34 (10): 50–63. doi:10.1145/125223.125244. S2CID 5603536.
- US patent 5649139, Weinreb, Daniel L. & Haradhvala, Sam J., "Method and apparatus for virtual memory mapping and transaction management in an object-oriented database system", published July 15, 1997, issued July 15, 1997, assigned to Object Design, Inc.
- Weinreb, Daniel; Feinberg, Neil; Gerson, Dan; Lamb, Charles (1991). "An object-oriented database system to support an integrated programming environment". In Gupta, R.; Horowitz, E. (Hrsg.) (eds.). Object-Oriented Databases with Applications to CASE, Networks, and VLSI Design. Series in Data and Knowledge Base Systems. Englewood Cliffs, New Jersey, S.: Prentice Hall. pp. 117–129.
