= Document examiner =

Document examiner may refer to:

- Questioned document examiner, a professional in the forensic examination of documents
- Symbolics Document Examiner, a software program
