= UIMS =

UIMS may refer to:

- United International Medical Schools
- Universal Information Management System
- User interface management systems
- University Institute of Management Sciences at Pir Mehr Ali Shah Arid Agriculture University, Rawalpindi, Pakistan
- Unknown Intellectual Mechanized Species, the main antagonistic race in the Galaxian 3 and Starblade video games
