= Info (Unix) =

Command-line documentation and help utility

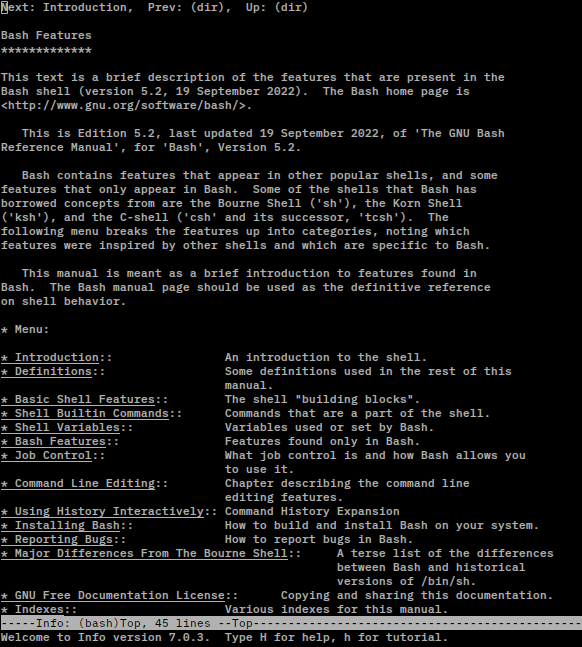
- Screenshot of GNU Info showing an info page for Bash shell
- Stable release: 7.2 / December 23, 2024; 17 months ago
- Written in: C
- Operating system: Unix-like
- Platform: Cross-platform
- Type: Documentation viewer
- License: GNU General Public License
- Website: www.gnu.org/software/texinfo/

Info is a software utility which forms a hypertextual, multipage documentation and help viewer working on a command-line interface.

Info reads info files generated by the texinfo program and presents the documentation as a tree with simple commands to traverse the tree and to follow cross references. For instance, pressing the space bar scrolls down within the current tree node or goes to the next node in the current document if already at the bottom of the current node, allowing to read the contents of an info file sequentially. Pressing the backspace key moves in the opposite direction. Furthermore:

- ] goes to the next node in the current document.
- [ goes to the previous node in the current document.
- n goes to the next node on the same level as the current node.
- p goes to the previous node on the same level as the current node.
- u ("up") goes to the parent of the current node.
- l goes to the last visited node.
- Moving the cursor over a link (a word preceded by an asterisk) and pressing the enter key follows the link.
- Pressing the tab key will move the cursor to the next nearest link.

The C implementation of info was designed as the main documentation system of GNU based operating systems and was then ported to other Unix-like operating systems. However, info files had already been in use on ITS emacs. On the TOPS-20 operating system INFO was called XINFO.

== List of Info readers ==
- GNU info, distributed with Texinfo
- pinfo
- tkman
- tkinfo
- khelpcenter
- emacs
- info.vim (Vim plugin)
- vinfo (Vim plugin)
- GNOME Yelp

== See also ==
- Manual page (Unix)
- List of Unix commands
