= Symbolics Document Examiner =

Symbolics Document Examiner is a powerful and early hypertext system developed at Symbolics (a manufacturer of high-end workstations) by Janet Walker in 1985. The Symbolics Document Examiner was first used for a hypertext implementation of the Symbolics manual in the sixth release of the Genera operating system, and was well liked, winning an award from the Society for Technical Documentation.

== History ==
A screenshot of the included help documentation in Genera being looked at with Document Examiner.

The Symbolics manual was an 8,000-page document that was represented in a 10,000-node "hyperdocument" containing 23,000 links in all. The entire manual required 10 MB of storage space - a significant amount in 1985, even on the Lisp machines Symbolics sold. The Symbolics Document Examiner used a hierarchical structure, which differed from other experimental hypertext systems; it apparently was partially inspired by an even earlier hypertext system, the precursor to Texinfo which originated with Emacs.

Symbolics Document Examiner users could add bookmarks, which allowed returning to specific items easier; this method was later incorporated in graphical web browsers. The system also supported on-line substring searching. The biggest drawback to the Symbolics Document Examiner was that users could not make changes to any information or to a document's navigation.

The authoring environment for the Document Examiner was Symbolics Concordia. With Symbolics Concordia it was possible to edit all documentation.
