= Emack & Bolio's =

American ice cream store chain

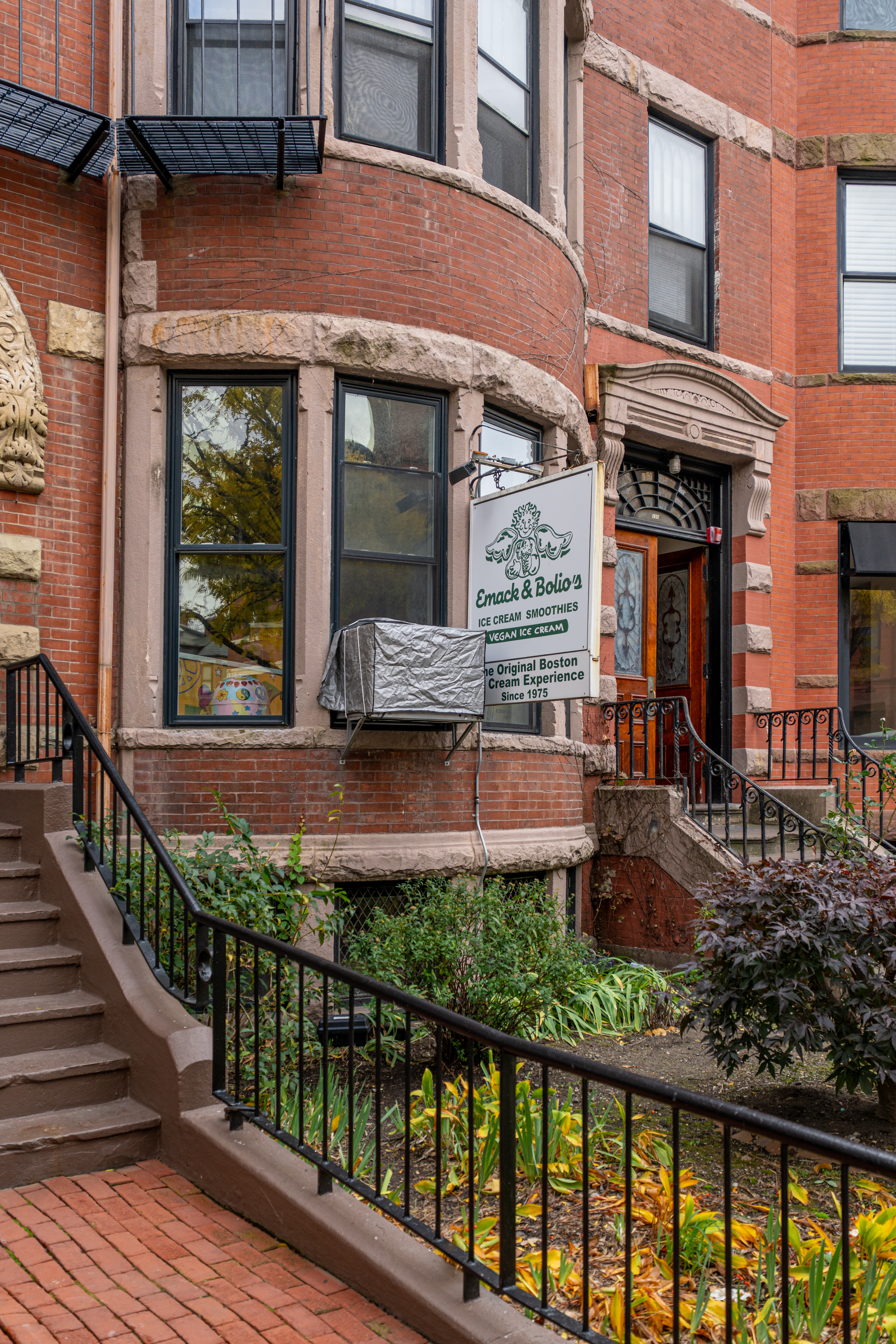
- Storefront in Newbury Street (2025)
- Industry: Retail
- Founded: 1975; 51 years ago
- Founder: Robert Rook
- Headquarters: United States
- Area served: Mainland China, Hong Kong, Malaysia, Philippines, Singapore, South Korea, Taiwan, Thailand, UAE, USA
- Products: Ice cream, chocolate, hot fudge, smoothies
- Website: emackandbolios.com

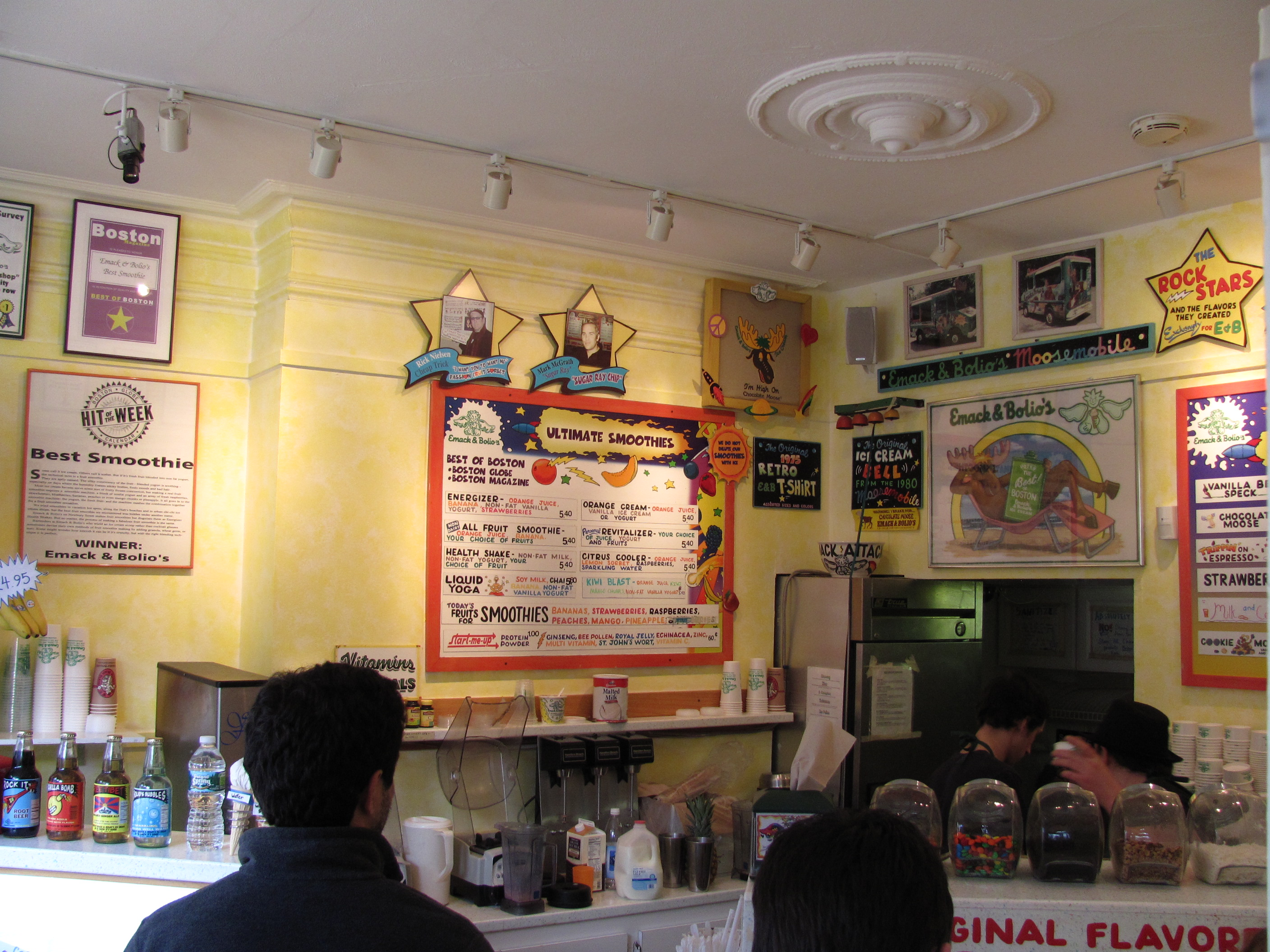
Emack & Bolio's on Newbury Street in Boston

Emack & Bolio's is a chain of ice cream stores based in Boston, Massachusetts, United States.

== History ==
The chain was founded by Robert Rook, a lawyer and self-declared hippie who has worked closely with the homeless, Vietnam war protesters, civil and gay rights advocates, and numerous rock bands such as Aerosmith, U2, Boston, The Cars, and James Brown. Emack and Bolio's was founded in 1975, three years before Ben and Jerry's used the concept of a hippie ice cream store. There are now a few stores in other states, including New York, Florida, New Jersey and Illinois, apart from the ones in Massachusetts.

The first international locations opened in Bangkok, Thailand in 2014 and in Abu Dhabi, UAE. A shop in Xian, China and one in Hong Kong opened in 2015. By 2017 there were shops in 6 different Asian countries.

== Name ==
The store was named after two homeless men for whom Robert Rook did pro bono work, who asked that the ice cream shop be named after them. Emack and Bolio were mascots of a sort for the first store.

It has been noted that Emacs, text editing software popular with computer programmers, and BOLIO, a text-formatting program, were developed within walking distance of a store near MIT. The explanation by the GNU Emacs Project does not indicate a connection.
