= David A. Moon =

American computer scientist

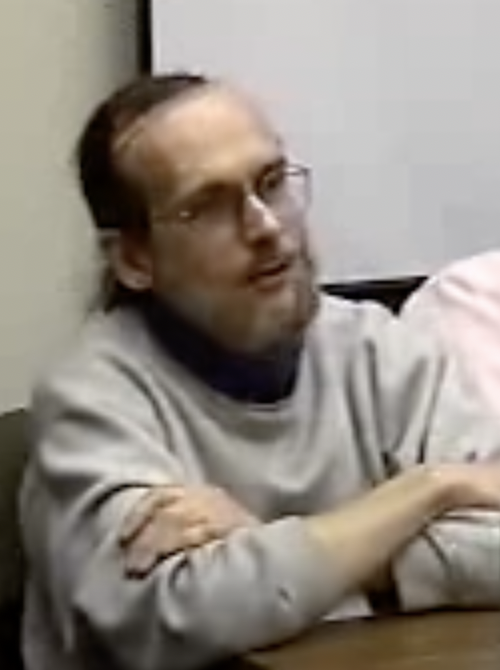
- David A. Moon in 2001
- Occupation: Computer scientist
- Known for: Lisp, Symbolics, Emacs, Dylan
- Website: users.rcn.com/david-moon

David A. Moon is a programmer and computer scientist, known for his work on the Lisp programming language, as co-author of the Emacs text editor, as the inventor of ephemeral garbage collection, and as one of the designers of the Dylan programming language. Guy L. Steele Jr. and Richard P. Gabriel (1993) name him as a leader of the Common Lisp movement and describe him as "a seductively powerful thinker, quiet and often insulting, whose arguments are almost impossible to refute".

== Work ==
Maclisp, a variant of Lisp developed at the Massachusetts Institute of Technology (MIT) by Richard Greenblatt in the late 1960s, originally ran on the PDP-6 and PDP-10 computers made by Digital Equipment Corporation. In the early 1970s, Moon headed a project at MIT that reimplemented Maclisp on a different kind of computer, the Honeywell 6180 running the Multics operating system. The compiler that he developed, NCOMPLR, became the "standard against which all other Lisp compilers were measured". As part of this project, he also wrote what became the standard manual for Maclisp more generally, titled the MacLISP Reference Manual but often called the Moonual.

Moon was one of the original members of Greenblatt's project to develop the MIT Lisp Machine, beginning in 1974. In 1976, with Steele, he wrote the first (TECO-based) version of the Emacs text editor, and in 1978 with Daniel Weinreb he coauthored the manual for the Lisp Machine, known as the chine nual. With Howard Cannon, he developed Flavors, a system for doing object-oriented programming with multiple inheritance on the Lisp Machine. As part of the Lisp Machine project, he also invented ephemeral garbage collection, an advance that led to the widespread use of continuously-operating garbage collection systems in Lisp more generally.

When Symbolics was founded in 1980 to commercialize the Lisp Machine, he became one of its founders. He continued to develop new hardware and software at Symbolics, and was listed as a Symbolics Fellow in 1989, but left the company in 1990 to join a project to develop a new operating system. He also made important contributions to the standardization of Common Lisp.

Later, he worked for Apple Computer, where he became one of "the primary contributors to the language design" for the Dylan programming language.
