= Spacemacs =

Free software

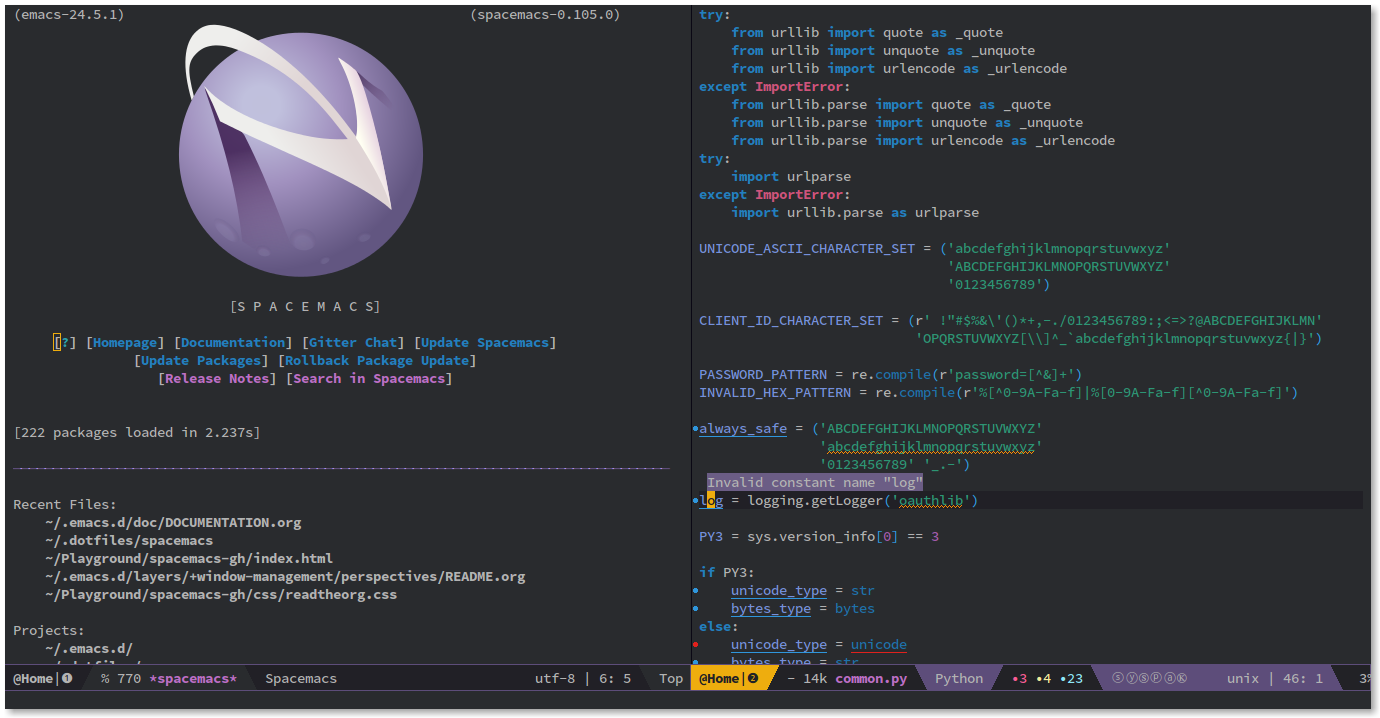
- Spacemacs with recent files and editing windows open
- Original author(s): Sylvain Benner
- Developer(s): Sylvain Benner and many others
- Initial release: 30 October 2014; 10 years ago
- Repository: github.com/syl20bnr/spacemacs
- Written in: Emacs Lisp
- Operating system: Unix, Linux, Windows NT, macOS
- Available in: English (by default)
- Type: Text editor
- License: GPL-3.0-or-later
- Website: www.spacemacs.org

Spacemacs is a configuration framework for GNU Emacs. It can take advantage of all of GNU Emacs' features, including both graphical and command-line user interfaces, and being executable under X Window System and within a Unix shell terminal. It is free and open-source software (FOSS) released under the GPL-3.0-or-later license.

Spacemacs consists mainly of configuration files, pre-defined internal commands, and configurations for various plug-ins (called 'packages'). It features a novel mnemonic key binding design (e.g., commands for file manipulation often start with "f",) which attempts to improve ergonomics (and avoid emacs pinky), a system for adding or excluding pre-configured features called 'layers', and includes verbose software documentation. It has three user-selectable input modes: Emacs mode, Vim mode (based on the evil Emacs package for Vim emulation), and Hybrid mode.

Spacemacs has a light and dark theme that are the fifth most downloaded emacs theme as of 2025 based on MELPA downloads.

As of 2021, its repository on GitHub has been starred over 21,100 times and has over 11,300 commits.

== See also ==
- Vim
- Emacs
- Comparison of text editors
- Editor war
- Doom Emacs
