= Robert J. Chassell =

Free software people (1946–2017)

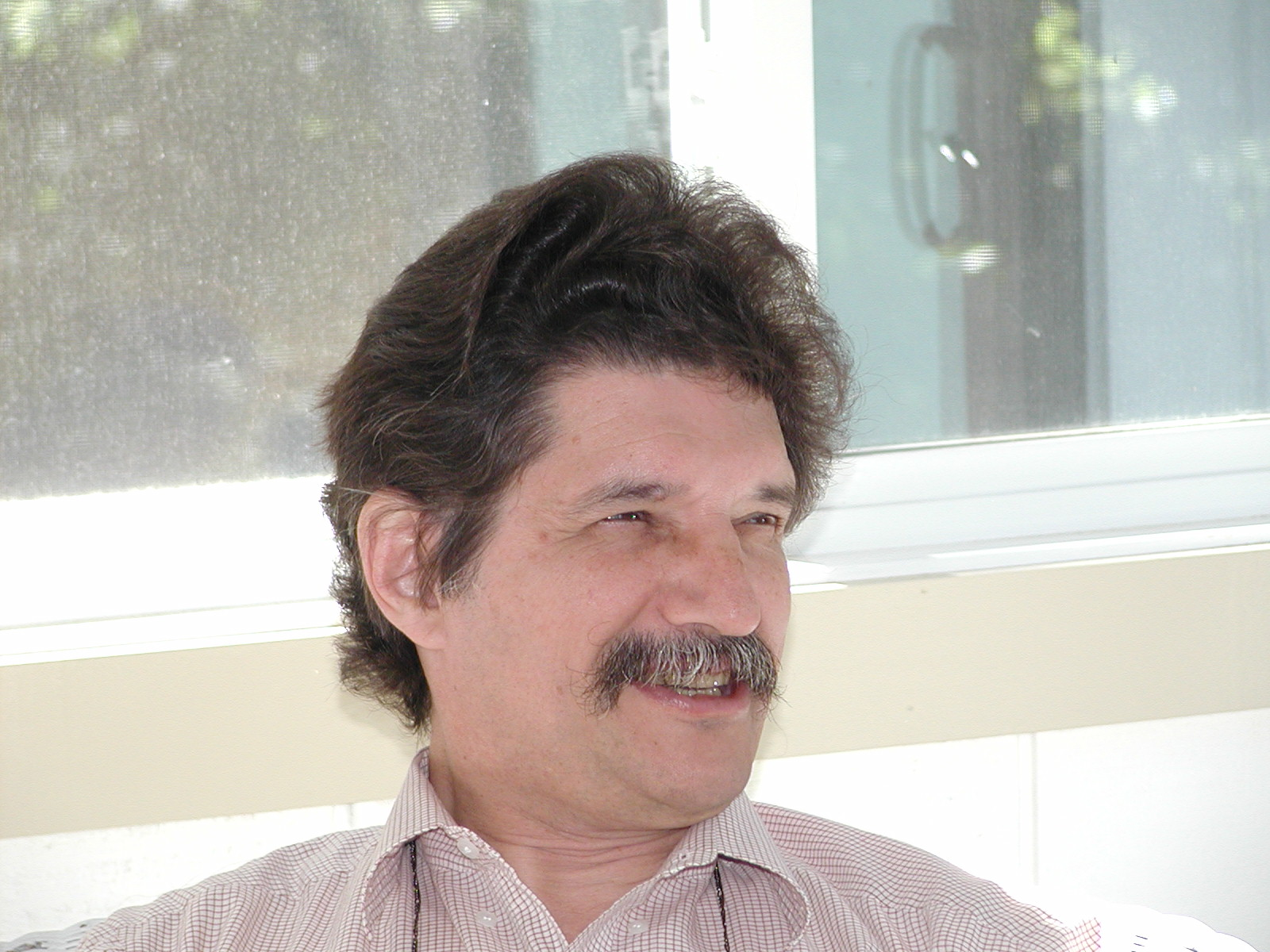
- Born: 22 August 1946; Bennington, Vermont, U.S.
- Died: 30 June 2017 (aged 70); Great Barrington, Massachusetts, U.S.

Robert Chassell (22 August 1946 – 30 June 2017) was one of the founding directors of the Free Software Foundation (FSF).

== Life ==
Chassell was born on 22 August 1946, in Bennington, VT. He read economics at Peterhouse, Cambridge University.

In 1985, he became one of the founding directors of the FSF. While on the Board of Directors, he was also the treasurer for the FSF. At this time, he started the Texinfo documentation system for GNU together with Richard Stallman.

He left the FSF to become a full-time speaker on free software topics. He was diagnosed with progressive supranuclear palsy (PSP) in 2010, and died as a result on 30 June 2017.

Chassell has authored several books including:

- Chassell, Robert J. (2003). Software Freedom: An Introduction. Boston: GNUpress. ISBN 1-882114-95-7.
- Chassell, Robert J. (2004). An introduction to Programming in Emacs Lisp. Boston: GNUpress. ISBN 1-882114-56-6.

== Later life and death ==
He was diagnosed with progressive supranuclear palsy (PSP), a rare neurodegenerative disorder, in 2010, and died as a result of the disease on 30 June 2017 in Great Barrington, Massachusetts, at the age of 70. His death was marked by tributes from figures across the free software community, including Bradley M. Kuhn and the Software Freedom Conservancy.
