= Doom Emacs =

Configuration framework for GNU Emacs

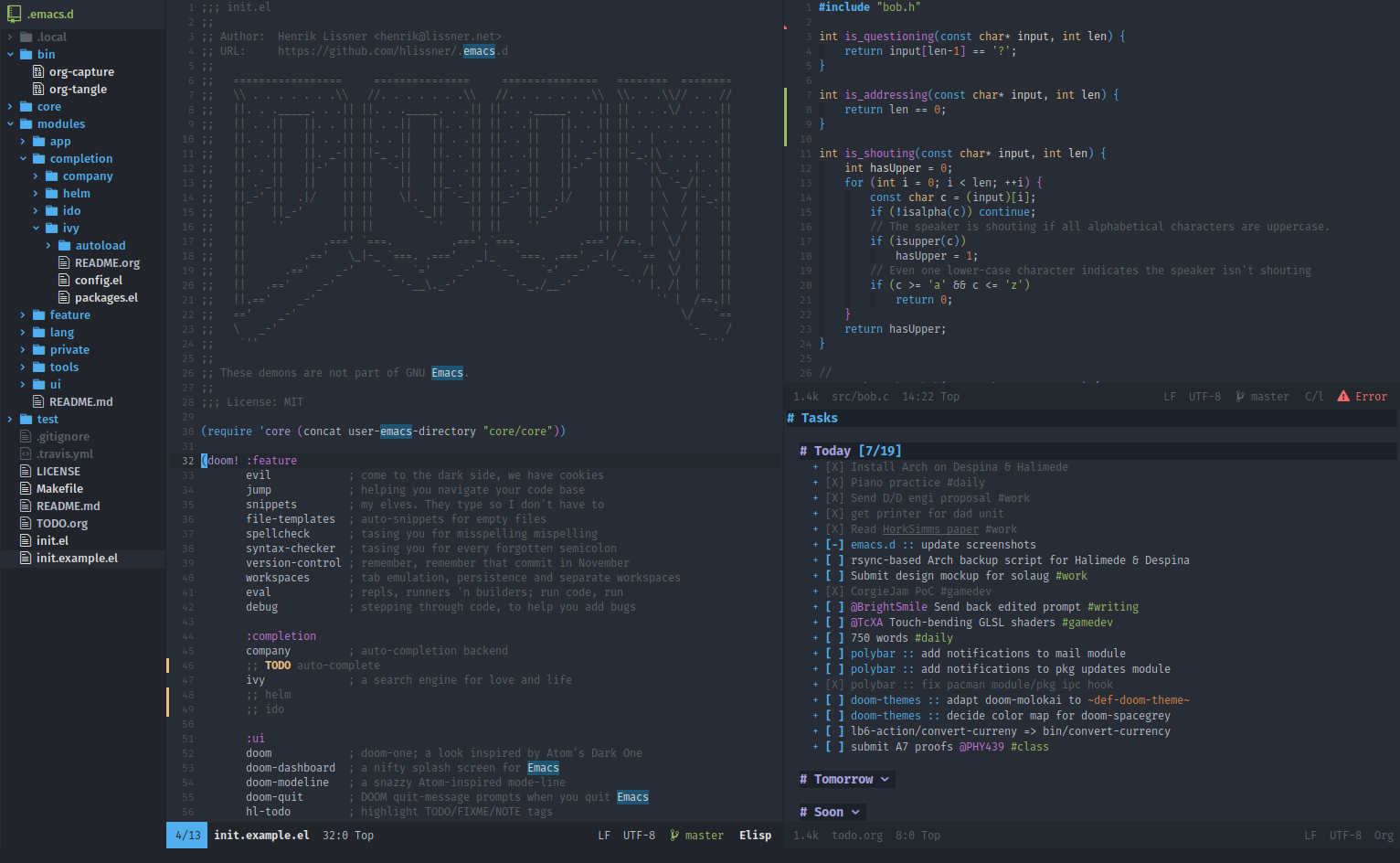
- A screenshot of Doom Emacs in action
- Original author: Henrik Lissner
- Stable release: 2.2.4 / 1 September 2026; 5 days ago
- Written in: Emacs Lisp
- Operating system: Cross-platform
- Available in: English
- Type: Emacs configuration framework
- License: MIT License
- Website: https://doomemacs.org
- Repository: github.com/doomemacs/core

Doom Emacs is a configuration framework for GNU Emacs. It aims to balance stability, reproducibility, and efficiency while maintaining the flexibility of a custom configuration. It is named after Doom, the classic game by id Software.

Doom Emacs includes various tools and tweaks to simplify configuration. It features a dedicated helper utility that automates updates and personal setup.

Users can customize Doom Emacs with over 150 modules, enabling tweaks and additional features. These modules range from basic language support to UI modifications, allowing users to tailor Doom Emacs to their personal computing environment.

== See also ==
- Spacemacs
