= Object Design, Incorporated =

Former American software company (1988–2002)

Object Design
- Industry: software
- Founded: 1988
- Founder: Daniel Weinreb
- Headquarters: Burlington, Massachusetts, United States
- Parent: Symbolics

Object Design, Incorporated (often called ODI) was a software company founded by Daniel Weinreb in 1988 which developed and commercialized an object database called ObjectStore.

Object Design was founded by several former Symbolics employees, including Daniel Weinreb, and was based in Burlington, Massachusetts.

Its ObjectStore object-oriented database shipped in 1990.

In 1994, ODI was listed as No. 1 on Inc. magazine's list of fastest-growing private companies in the U.S. A major early customer was Telstra, which used it to map toll-free telephone numbers to an end point close to the caller, for example a local taxi company or chain restaurant. ODI's went public in 1996, and was listed on NASDAQ as ODIS.

In 1999, ODI shipped its eXcelon XML application development environment, which it marketed as an "integration server".

In January 2000, ODI was renamed eXcelon and focused its marketing on XML integration software.

In 2002, ODI was acquired by Progress Software, which continued to develop it. In 2013, Progress Software sold the ObjectStore product line (among others) to Aurea Software, Inc., a newly formed operating subsidiary of ESW Capital, which in turn is the investment arm of Trilogy Enterprises. As part of the deal, ObjectStore moved to a separate operating subsidiary of ESW Capital.
