= EINE and ZWEI =

Two discontinued Emacs-like text editors

EINE and ZWEI are two discontinued Emacs-like text editors developed by Daniel Weinreb and Mike McMahon for Lisp machines in the 1970s and 1980s.

== History ==
EINE was a text editor developed in the late 1970s. In terms of features, its goal was to "do what Stallman's PDP-10 (original) Emacs does". It was an early example of what would become many Emacs-like text editors. Unlike the original TECO-based Emacs, but like Multics Emacs, EINE was written in Lisp. It used Lisp Machine Lisp. Stallman later wrote GNU Emacs, which was written in C and Emacs Lisp and extensible in Emacs Lisp. EINE also made use of the window system of the Lisp machine and was the first Emacs to have a graphical user interface.

In the 1980s, EINE was developed into ZWEI. Innovations included programmability in Lisp Machine Lisp, and a new and more flexible doubly linked list method of internally representing buffers.

ZWEI would eventually become the editor library used for Symbolics' Zmacs (Emacs-like editor), Zmail (mail client), and Converse (message client), which were integrated into the Genera operating system which Symbolics developed for their Lisp machines.

== Naming ==
EINE is a recursive acronym for "EINE Is Not Emacs", coined in August 1977. It was a play on Ted Anderson's TINT, "TINT is not TECO". Anderson would later retort with "SINE is not EINE".

ZWEI follows this pattern as an acronym for "ZWEI Was Eine Initially".

With "zwei" being the German word for "two", "EINE" could be (re-)interpreted as being a reference to the German word for "one" (in the feminine adjectival form, as in "eine Implementierung", "one implementation").
