= Macintosh Common Lisp =

Macintosh Common Lisp (MCL) is an implementation and IDE for the Common Lisp programming language. Various versions of MCL run under the classic Mac OS (m68k and PPC) and Mac OS X.

Versions of MCL up to and including 5.1 are proprietary. Version 5.2 has been open sourced.

In 2009 a new different version of MCL has been open sourced: RMCL. RMCL is based on MCL 5.1 and does run under Rosetta on Intel-based Macs.

== Features of MCL ==
MCL was famous for its integration with the Macintosh toolbox (later: Apple Carbon), which allowed direct access to most of the Mac OS functionality directly from Lisp. This was achieved with a low-level interface that allowed direct manipulation of native Mac OS data structures from Lisp, together with a high-level interface that was more convenient to use.

In a 2001 article in Dr. Dobb's Journal, Peter Norvig wrote that "MCL is my favorite IDE on the Macintosh platform for any language and is a serious rival to those on other platforms".

== History of MCL ==
Development on MCL began in 1984.

Over its history, MCL has been known under different names:

Running on 68k-based Apple Macintosh Computers:

- 1987, Coral Common Lisp
- 1987, Macintosh Allegro Common Lisp
- 1988, Apple Macintosh Common Lisp

Running on PowerPC-based Apple Macintosh Computers:

- 1994, Digitool Macintosh Common Lisp

It has also spawned at least one separately maintained fork:

- 1998, Clozure CL (CCL), known previously as OpenMCL
- In 2007 MCL 5.2 was open sourced.
- In 2009 RMCL (MCL running under Rosetta) was published as open source.
- Since 2009 an open source version of RMCL (based on MCL 5.2) is hosted at Google Code MCL. This version runs under Rosetta (Apple's PPC to Intel code translator that is an optional install under Mac OS X 10.6).
