= Multics Emacs =

Multics version of Emacs text editor

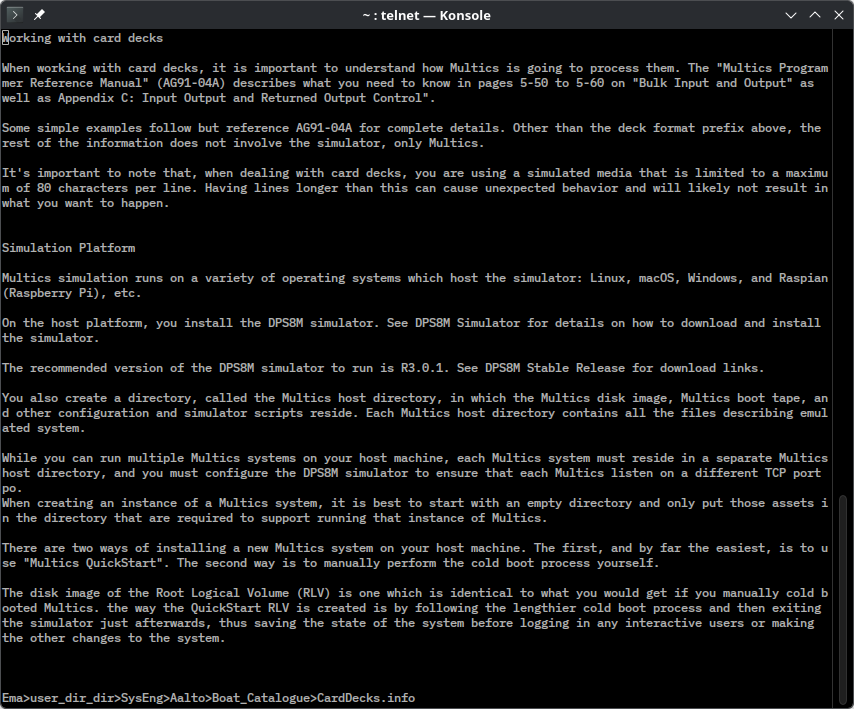
- Screenshot of Multics Emacs opening a file
- Original author: Bernard Greenberg
- Developer: Honeywell
- Initial release: 1978; 48 years ago
- Written in: Maclisp
- Operating system: Multics
- Available in: English
- Type: Text editor

Multics Emacs is an early implementation of the Emacs text editor. It was written in Maclisp by Bernard Greenberg at Honeywell's Cambridge Information Systems Lab in 1978, as a successor to the original 1976 TECO implementation of Emacs and a precursor of later GNU Emacs.

It has been claimed to be the first version of Emacs to be written in the Lisp programming language, although the same claim has also been made for the Lisp Machine editors EINE and ZWEI, also written in the late 1970s. As well as the editor itself being written in Lisp, user-supplied extensions were also written in Lisp. The choice of Lisp provided more extensibility than ever before, and has been followed by most subsequent Emacs implementations.

Rather than using TECO's gap buffer representation for the text being edited, it used a doubly linked list of lines of text.
