= McCLIM =

McCLIM is an implementation of the Common Lisp Interface Manager (CLIM), for the programming language Common Lisp. The project is named partly after Mike McDonald, the person who began it. It is free and open-source software released under the GNU Lesser General Public License (LGPL) version 2.1.

The CLIM 2.0 Specification is available as multiple HTML pages. The specification's source code, in the TeX digital typography system, is in McCLIM tarballs.
