= Zmacs =

Text editor for Lisp machines

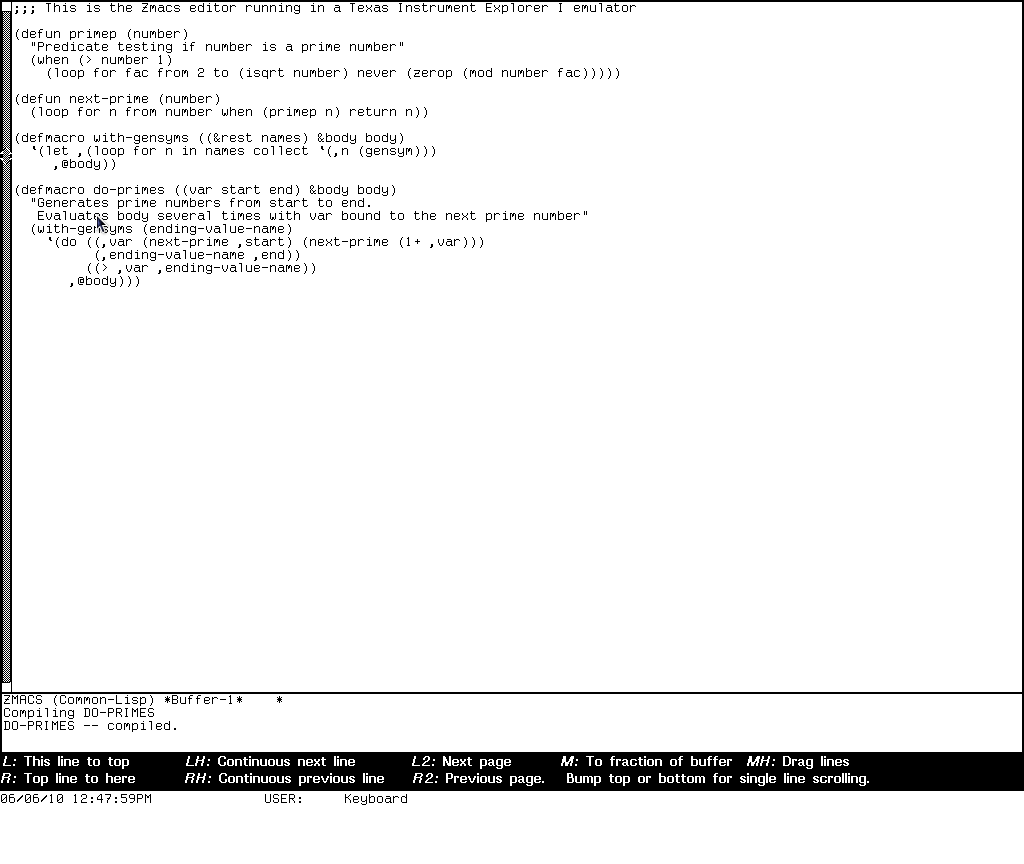
- Zmacs in Texas Instrument Explorer 1
- Developer: MIT
- Operating system: Lisp machine
- Type: Text editor

Zmacs is one of the many variants of the Emacs text editor. Zmacs was written for the MIT Lisp machine and runs on its descendants (Symbolics Genera, LMI Lambda, TI Explorer). Zmacs is written in Lisp Machine Lisp (called ZetaLisp on Symbolics Lisp Machines). It is based on the ZWEI programming substrate, which stands for "Zwei Was EINE Initially"; Zwei was a collection of routines which could be used to easily implement other programs, like the Symbolics mail program, Zmail.

Zmacs also supports buffers and modes. Zmacs also uses the window system of the Lisp Machine with support for mouse and windows. Zmacs supports unlimited backup of files, since the file system of the Lisp Machine supports file versions. It is not compatible with GNU Emacs and its Emacs Lisp.
