= Bytecode =

Instruction set designed to be run by a software interpreter

Bytecode (also called portable code or p-code) is an instruction set designed for efficient execution by a software interpreter. Unlike human-readable source code, bytecodes are compact numeric codes, constants, and references (normally numeric addresses) that encode the result of compiler parsing and performing semantic analysis of things like type, scope, and nesting depths of program objects.

The name bytecode stems from instruction sets that have one-byte opcodes followed by optional parameters. Intermediate representations such as bytecode may be output by programming language implementations to ease interpretation, or it may be used to reduce hardware and operating system dependence by allowing the same code to run cross-platform, on different devices. Bytecode may often be either directly executed on a virtual machine (a p-code machine, i.e., interpreter), or it may be further compiled into machine code for better performance.

Since bytecode instructions are processed by software, they may be arbitrarily complex, but are nonetheless often akin to traditional hardware instructions: virtual stack machines are the most common, but virtual register machines have been built also. Different parts may often be stored in separate files, similar to object modules, but dynamically loaded during execution.

== Execution ==
A bytecode program may be executed by parsing and directly executing the instructions, one at a time. This kind of bytecode interpreter is very portable. Some systems, called dynamic translators, or just-in-time (JIT) compilers, translate bytecode into machine code as necessary at runtime. This makes the virtual machine hardware-specific but does not lose the portability of the bytecode. For example, Java and Smalltalk code is typically stored in bytecode format, which is typically then JIT compiled to translate the bytecode to machine code before execution. This introduces a delay before a program is run, when the bytecode is compiled to native machine code, but improves execution speed considerably compared to interpreting source code directly, normally by around an order of magnitude (10x).

Because of its performance advantage, today many language implementations execute a program in two phases, first compiling the source code into bytecode, and then passing the bytecode to the virtual machine. There are bytecode based virtual machines of this sort for Java, Raku, Python, PHP, (Note: PHP has just-in-time compilation in PHP 8, and before while not on in the default version, had options like HHVM. For older versions of PHP: Although PHP opcodes are generated each time the program is launched, and are always interpreted and not just-in-time compiled.) Tcl, mawk and Forth (however, Forth is seldom compiled via bytecodes in this way, and its virtual machine is more generic instead). The implementation of Perl and Ruby 1.8 instead work by walking an abstract syntax tree representation derived from the source code.

More recently, the authors of V8 and Dart have challenged the notion that intermediate bytecode is needed for fast and efficient VM implementation. Both of these language implementations currently do direct JIT compiling from source code to machine code with no bytecode intermediary. For example, early versions of V8 JavaScript engine deliberately bypassed an intermediate bytecode tier, performing direct JIT compilation from source text straight to native machine code via its "Full-codegen" compiler.

However, this architecture faced severe memory bloat on mobile devices and unmanageable complexity when supporting newer, complex ECMAScript specifications. As a result, V8 completely overhauled its execution pipeline in 2017, introducing a low-level register-based bytecode interpreter named "Ignition." Modern versions of V8 now rely heavily on intermediate bytecode as their foundational execution tier, gradually escalating "hot" functions from bytecode to a multi-tiered native machine code JIT architecture (Sparkplug, Maglev, and TurboFan).

== Examples ==
- ActionScript executes in the ActionScript Virtual Machine (AVM), which is part of Flash Player and AIR. ActionScript code is typically transformed into bytecode format by a compiler. Examples of compilers include one built into Adobe Flash Professional and one built into Adobe Flash Builder and available in the Adobe Flex SDK.
- Adobe Flash objects
- BANCStar, originally bytecode for an interface-building tool but used also as a language. BANCStar was designed as an internal machine language generated by a "screen generator" tool for financial applications, but was later written directly by programmers as a de facto language in its own right.
- Berkeley Packet Filter
- EBPF
- Berkeley Pascal
- Byte Code Engineering Library
- C to Java virtual machine compilers
- CLISP implementation of Common Lisp used to compile only to bytecode for many years; however, now it also supports compiling to native code with the help of GNU lightning
- CMUCL and Scieneer Common Lisp implementations of Common Lisp can compile either to native code or to bytecode, which is far more compact
- Common Intermediate Language executed by Common Language Runtime, used by .NET languages such as C#
- Dalvik bytecode, designed for the Android platform, is executed by the Dalvik virtual machine
- Dis bytecode, designed for the Inferno (operating system), is executed by the Dis virtual machine
- EiffelStudio for the Eiffel programming language
- EM, the Amsterdam Compiler Kit virtual machine used as an intermediate compiling language and as a modern bytecode language
- Emacs is a text editor with most of its functions implemented by Emacs Lisp, its built-in dialect of Lisp. These features are compiled into bytecode. This architecture allows users to customize the editor with a high level language, which after compiling into bytecode yields reasonable performance.
- Embeddable Common Lisp implementation of Common Lisp can compile to bytecode or C code
- Common Lisp provides a disassemble function which prints to the standard output the underlying code of a specified function. The result is implementation-dependent and may or may not resolve to bytecode. Its inspection can be utilized for debugging and optimization purposes. Steel Bank Common Lisp, for instance, produces:

(disassemble '(lambda (x) (print x)))
; disassembly for (LAMBDA (X))
; 2436F6DF:       850500000F22     TEST EAX, [#x220F0000]     ; no-arg-parsing entry point
;       E5:       8BD6             MOV EDX, ESI
;       E7:       8B05A8F63624     MOV EAX, [#x2436F6A8]      ; #<FDEFINITION object for PRINT>
;       ED:       B904000000       MOV ECX, 4
;       F2:       FF7504           PUSH DWORD PTR [EBP+4]
;       F5:       FF6005           JMP DWORD PTR [EAX+5]
;       F8:       CC0A             BREAK 10                   ; error trap
;       FA:       02               BYTE #X02
;       FB:       18               BYTE #X18                  ; INVALID-ARG-COUNT-ERROR
;       FC:       4F               BYTE #X4F                  ; ECX

- Ericsson implementation of Erlang uses BEAM bytecodes
- Ethereum's Virtual Machine (EVM) is the runtime environment, using its own bytecode, for transaction execution in Ethereum (smart contracts). The EVM is a 256-bit stack machine; compiled smart contract bytecode executes as a sequence of EVM opcodes.
- Icon and Unicon programming languages
- Infocom used the Z-machine to make its software applications more portable
- Java bytecode, which is executed by the Java virtual machine
  - ASM
  - BCEL
  - Javassist
- Keiko bytecode used by the Oberon-2 programming language to make it and the Oberon operating system more portable.
- KEYB, the MS-DOS/PC DOS keyboard driver with its resource file KEYBOARD.SYS containing layout information and short p-code sequences executed by an interpreter inside the resident driver.
- LLVM IR
- LSL, a scripting language used in virtual worlds compiles into bytecode running on a virtual machine. Second Life has the original Mono version, Inworldz developed the Phlox version.
- Lua language uses a register-based bytecode virtual machine
- m-code of the MATLAB language
- Malbolge is an esoteric machine language for a ternary virtual machine.
- Microsoft P-code used in Visual C++ and Visual Basic
- Multiplan
- O-code of the BCPL programming language
- OCaml language optionally compiles to a compact bytecode form
- p-code of UCSD Pascal implementation of the Pascal language
- Parrot virtual machine
- Pick BASIC also referred to as Data BASIC or MultiValue BASIC
- The R environment for statistical computing offers a bytecode compiler through the compiler package, now standard with R version 2.13.0. It is possible to compile this version of R so that the base and recommended packages exploit this.
- Pyramid 2000 adventure game
- Python scripts are compiled on execution to Python's bytecode language, and the compiled files (.pyc) are cached inside the script's folder

Compiled code can be analysed and investigated using a built-in tool for debugging the low-level bytecode. The tool can be initialized from the shell, for example:

>>> import dis # "dis" - Disassembler of Python byte code into mnemonics.
>>> dis.dis('print("Hello, World!")')
  1           0 LOAD_NAME                0 (print)
              2 LOAD_CONST               0 ('Hello, World!')
              4 CALL_FUNCTION            1
              6 RETURN_VALUE

- Scheme 48 implementation of Scheme using bytecode interpreter
- Bytecodes of many implementations of the Smalltalk language
- The Spin interpreter built into the Parallax Propeller microcontroller
- The SQLite database engine translates SQL statements into a bespoke byte-code format.
- Apple SWEET16
- Tcl
- TIMI is used by compilers on the IBM i platform.
- Tiny BASIC
- Visual Basic for Applications compiles to bytecode.
- Visual FoxPro compiles to bytecode
- WebAssembly
- YARV and Rubinius for Ruby
- ZCODE
- Zend Engine opcodes for PHP

== See also ==
- Computing platform – Environment in which a piece of software is executed
- Intermediate representation – Data structure or code used by a compiler
- Runtime system – Computer system that provides behavior needed by running code
