= List of open-source programming languages =

This is a list of open-source programming languages and the open-source license it is released under.

List of open-source programming languages
Programming language	License
ACL2	BSD
Agda	BSD-like
Apache Groovy	Apache License 2.0
AssemblyScript	Apache 2.0
Ballerina	Apache 2.0
Bash	GPL
Befunge	MIT
Bosque	MIT
C#	MIT, Apache 2.0
Carbon	Apache 2.0
Chapel	Apache 2.0
CLISP	GNU GPL
Clojure	Eclipse Public License 1.0
CMU Common Lisp	Public domain (mostly)
colorForth	Public domain
Crystal	Apache 2.0
Curry	BSD
Cython	Apache 2.0
D	Boost Software License
Dafny	MIT
Dart	BSD
Dash	BSD-style
Dylan (OpenDylan)	BSD
Elixir	Apache 2.0
Elm	Permissive (Revised BSD)
Embeddable Common Lisp	GNU LGPL
Erlang	Apache 2.0
F#	MIT
F* (F Star)	Apache 2.0
Factor	BSD
Fish (Unix shell)	GNU GPL
Free Pascal	GPL/LGPL with exceptions
Futhark	ISC
Gforth	GNU GPLv3
Gleam	Apache 2.0
GNU AWK	GPL (Gawk)
GnuCOBOL	GPL, LGPL
GNU Data Language (GDL)	GNU GPL-2.0
GNU Fortran	GNU GPL v3
Go	BSD-style
Golo	EPL-1.0
Gosu	Apache License 2.0
Hack	MIT
Haskell	BSD
Haxe	GPL 2.0, library: MIT
Icon	GPL-2.0-or-later
Idris	MIT
Inform	Artistic License 2.0
Io	MIT
ISLISP	Public domain
J	GPL
Java	GPL with Classpath Exception
Julia	MIT
Kotlin	Apache 2.0
LiveScript	MIT
Logo (UCB Logo)	GPL
Lua	MIT
Maclisp	Public domain
Malbolge	Public domain
Mercury	LGPL
MicroPython	MIT
Mojo	Apache 2.0 with LLVM Exceptions
NetRexx	ICU License
Nim	MIT
Nix	LGPL 2.1
Nu	Apache 2.0
Oberon	GPL-2.0
Object REXX	CPL 1.0, GPLv2
OCaml	LGPLv2.1
Odin	zlib
Perl	Artistic License or GPL
Pharo	MIT, partly Apache 2.0
PHP	PHP License
Pony	MIT
Pike	GPL/LGPL/MPL
PowerShell	MIT
Pure	LGPLv3+
Pure Data	BSD-3-Clause
PureScript	BSD
Python	Python Software Foundation License
R	GPL
Racket	MIT, Apache 2.0
Raku	GNU GPL or Artistic License 2.0
Reason	MIT
Red	modified BSD and Boost
Ring	MIT
Ruby	BSD, MIT, Ruby License
Rust	Apache 2.0 or MIT
Scala	BSD
Seed7	GPL, LGPL
SGLang	Apache License 2.0
Smalltalk (GNU Smalltalk)	GPL/LGPL
SNOBOL (CSNOBOL4)	BSD-like
Solidity	GPLv3
Steel Bank Common Lisp	Public domain and BSD-style
Swift	Apache 2.0
SWI-Prolog	BSD
Tcl	Tcl/Tk License
Terra	MIT
TypeScript	Apache 2.0
Umple	MIT
V	MIT
Vira	MIT
Vala	LGPL-2.1
WebAssembly	Apache 2.0
Zig	MIT
Z shell	MIT-style
Zero	Apache 2.0

== See also ==
- Free and open-source software (FOSS)
- List of CLI languages
- List of compilers and list of open-source compilers and assemblers
- List of free and open-source software packages
- List of free source code editors
- List of integrated development environments
- List of JVM languages
- List of markup languages
- List of open-source code libraries
- List of programming languages by type
- OpenJDK
