= Bill Schelter =

American mathematician and programmer

- Born: 1947
- Died: July 30, 2001 (aged 53–54)
- Education: Mathematics (Ph.D.)
- Alma mater: McGill University
- Occupations: Computer scientist, Mathematics Professor
- Employer: The University of Texas at Austin
- Known for: Austin Kyoto Common Lisp, GNU Common Lisp, GNU C compiler, Maxima

William Frederick Schelter (1947 – July 30, 2001) was a professor of mathematics at The University of Texas at Austin and a Lisp developer and programmer. Schelter is credited with the development of the GNU Common Lisp (GCL) implementation of Common Lisp and the GPL'd version of the computer algebra system Macsyma called Maxima. Schelter authored Austin Kyoto Common Lisp (AKCL) under contract with IBM. AKCL formed the foundation for Axiom, another computer algebra system. AKCL eventually became GNU Common Lisp. He is also credited with the first port of the GNU C compiler to the Intel 386 architecture, used in the original implementation of the Linux kernel.

Schelter obtained his Ph.D. at McGill University in 1972. His mathematical specialties were noncommutative ring theory and computational algebra and its applications, including automated theorem proving in geometry.

In the summer of 2001, age 54, he died suddenly of a heart attack while traveling in Russia.
