= VAX Common Lisp =

VAX LISP was an implementation of Common Lisp for VMS and ULTRIX on 32-bit VAXs. It was the first Common Lisp to be written for non-Lisp machines. It was initially boot-strapped from Carnegie Mellon University's Spice Lisp by recompiling its output but for VAX machine instruction and to use the large VAX stack. Some of the original developers came from CMU.

Features included:

- dumb-terminal IDE with Emacs-like editor (programming in Common Lisp)
- DECwindows- (X11-)based workstation IDE (with editor, debugger, and inspector)
- multi-threading (based on POSIX threads)
- a compiler that generated intermediate files which could be "fast-loaded"
- a patented mechanism for writing and reading the executable state of the entire virtual machine

During the development of the never-released V4.0 the product was sold off to Lucid Inc.
