= Python compiler =

Python compiler may refer to:

- Python, a native code compiler for CMU Common Lisp
- One of several compiler implementations for the Python programming language: see Python implementations
