= Kent Pitman =

American computer programmer

Kent M. Pitman
- Born: United States
- Citizenship: United States
- Education: Massachusetts Institute of Technology (MIT)
- Known for: Lisp, Scheme, HyperMeta Inc.
- Scientific career
- Fields: Computer science, programming
- Workplaces: Harlequin, HyperMeta Inc.
- Website: www.nhplace.com

Kent M. Pitman (KMP) is a programmer who has been involved for many years in the design, implementation, and use of systems based on the programming languages Lisp and Scheme. Since 2010, he has been President of HyperMeta Inc.

Pitman was chair of the ad hoc group (part of X3J13) that designed the Common Lisp Error and Condition System and is author of the proposal document that was ultimately adopted, and many papers on Lisp programming and computer programming in general.

While in high school, he saw output from one of the guess the animal pseudo-artificial intelligence (AI) games then popular. He considered implementing a version of the program in BASIC, but once at the Massachusetts Institute of Technology (MIT), instead he implemented it in several dialects of Lisp, including Maclisp.

He was a technical contributor to X3J13, the American National Standards Institute (ANSI) subcommittee that standardized Common Lisp and contributed to the design of the programming language. He prepared the document that became ANSI Common Lisp, the Common Lisp HyperSpec (a hypertext conversion of the standard), and the document that became International Organization for Standardization (ISO) ISLISP. He can often be found on the Usenet newsgroup comp.lang.lisp, where he is involved in discussions about Lisp and computer programming, and insider perspectives on Lisp evolution and Common Lisp standardization. In some posts there, he has expressed his opinion on open-source software, including open source implementations of Lisp and Scheme, as something that should be judged individually on its essential merits, rather than automatically considered good merely by being free or open.
