= GNU lightning =

- Developer: GNU Project
- Initial release: January 19, 2001; 25 years ago
- Stable release: 2.2.3 / 8 February 2024
- Operating system: Cross-platform
- Platform: GNU
- Type: Just-in-time compilation
- License: 2007: LGPL-3.0-or-later (Note: LGPL-3.0-or-later since 2007-07-01.); 2002: LGPL-2.1-or-later (Note: LGPL-2.1-or-later from 2002-06-25 until 2007-07-01.)
- Website: Official website
- Repository: git.savannah.gnu.org/cgit/lightning.git

GNU lightning is a free-software library for generating assembly language code (actually machine code) at run-time. Version 2.1.3, released in September 2019, supports backends for SPARC (32-bit), x86 (32- and 64-bit), MIPS, ARM (32- and 64-bit), ia64, HPPA, PowerPC (32-bit), Alpha, S390 and RISC-V (64-bit).

== Advantages over other libraries ==
The features GNU lightning provides make it useful for Just-in-Time Compilation. In comparison to libraries such as LLVM or libJIT, GNU lightning provides only a low-level interface for assembling from a standardized RISC assembly language—loosely based on the SPARC and MIPS architectures—into the target architecture's machine language.

== Disadvantages ==
It does not provide register allocation, data-flow or control-flow analysis, or optimization. Starting from 2.x, it generates code via intermediate graph, rather than one by one from each of its standardized instructions. This change allows inter-instruction optimization such as register allocation and dead code elimination.

== Instruction set ==
GNU lightning's instruction set is based loosely on existing RISC architectures.

=== Types ===
When required instructions handle data with these 9 types:

Type	C equivalent
c	signed char
uc	unsigned char
s	short
us	unsigned short
i	int
ui	unsigned int
l	long
f	float
d	double

== Projects that use GNU lightning ==
GNU Smalltalk, GNU Guile, and CLISP make use of GNU lightning for just-in-time compilation. GNU lightning was first developed as a tool to be used in GNU Smalltalk's dynamic translator from bytecodes to native code. GNU Guile 2.9.2 and later stop using GNU lightning 2.x instead their own fork based on GNU lightning 1.4 for native code generation, because GNU lightning 2.x devotes more complexity to inter-instruction optimization.
