= Practical Common Lisp =

Practical Common Lisp is an introductory book on the programming language Common Lisp by Peter Seibel. It features a fairly complete introduction to the language interspersed with practical example chapters, which show developing various pieces of software such as a unit testing framework, a library for parsing ID3 tags, a spam filter, and a SHOUTcast server.

At the Jolt Product Excellence and Productivity Awards in 2006, it won a Productivity Award in the technical book category.

The full text is available online. In a 2006 Google TechTalk, Seibel presented the book's main points in the context of linguistic relativity (the Sapir–Whorf hypothesis).

== See also ==
- Common Lisp the Language
