= Mocl =

mocl
- Paradigms: Multi-paradigm: procedural, functional, object-oriented, meta, reflective, generic
- Family: Lisp
- Developer: Wukix, Inc.
- First appeared: 23 June 2013; 11 years ago
- Stable release: 14.05 / 6 May 2014; 10 years ago
- Typing discipline: dynamic, strong
- Scope: Lexical, optionally dynamic
- Implementation language: Common Lisp
- Platform: IA-32, x86-64, ARM, ARM64
- OS: iOS, Android, macOS
- License: Proprietary
- Website: wukix.com/mocl

mocl is a programming language, a dialect and implementation of the language Lisp named Common Lisp. It is focused on mobile device platforms. It includes a compiler and runtime system. It currently runs on iOS, Android, and macOS.

== History ==
mocl was first announced on November 14, 2012. The first release was timed to occur at Lisp universal time 3581000000 (June 23, 2013). The most recent release of mocl is named Paren Mage and was released on May 6, 2014, adding support for macOS application creation and a remote read–eval–print loop (REPL) that runs on the mobile device.

As of September 2021, the website of mocl appears inactive.
