= Timothy Koschmann =

American social scientist

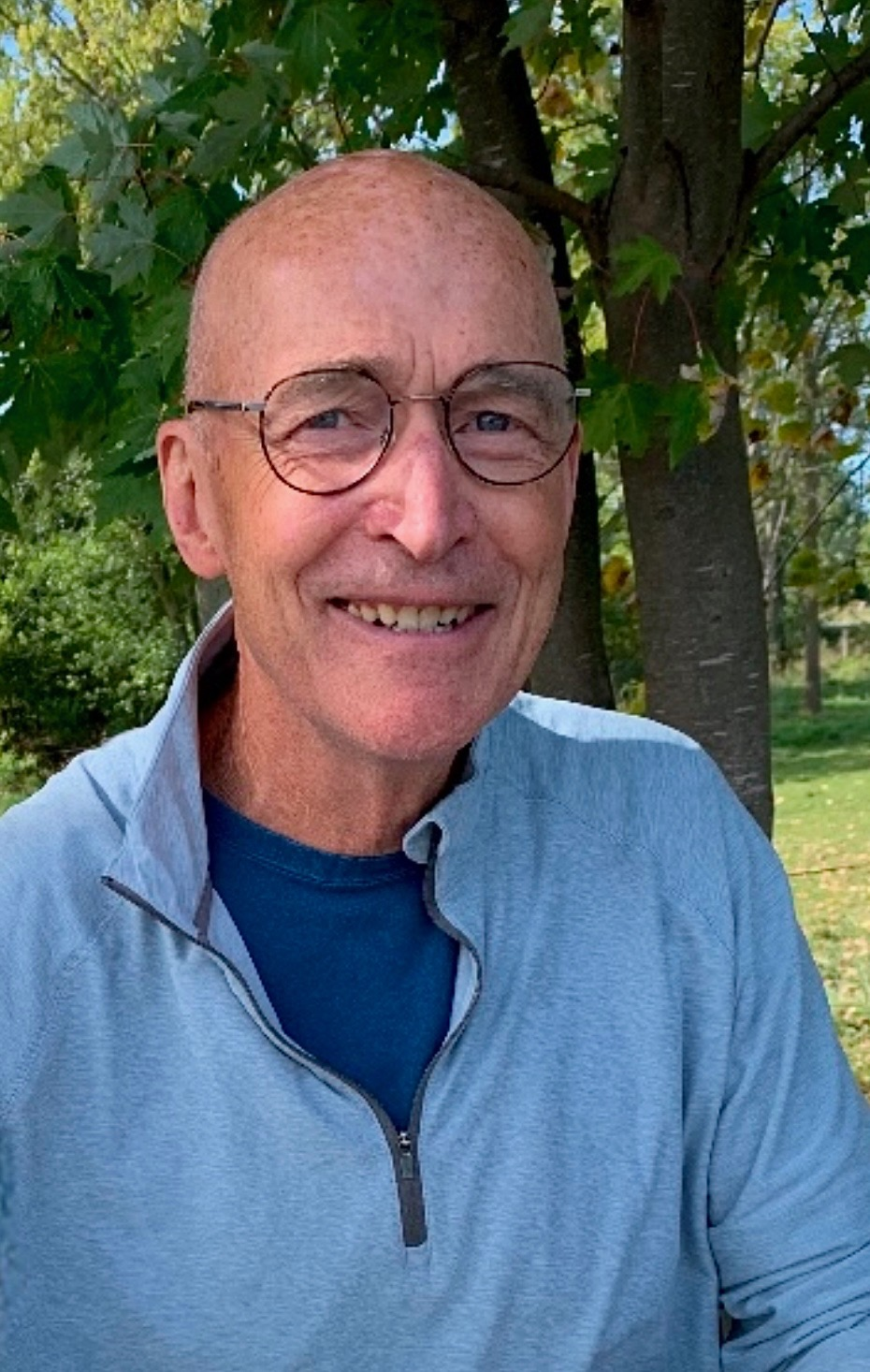
- Born: Timothy Durant Koschmann; 1950 (age 75–76); Milwaukee, Wisconsin, US
- Known for: CSCL: Theory and Practice of an Emerging Paradigm
- Spouse: Barbara Gross
- Children: 3
- Scientific career
- Fields: Learning Sciences

Timothy Durant Koschmann (born 1950) is an American social scientist who is professor emeritus of medical education at Southern Illinois University School of Medicine. His works are particularly concerned with ethnomethodological approaches in education.

He studied philosophy at the University of Missouri-Kansas City (B.A., 1968-1972), experimental psychology at the University of Wisconsin-Milwaukee (M.S., 1976-1980), and computer science at Illinois Institute of Technology (Ph.D., 1982-1987)

He was one of the founders of the International Society of the Learning Sciences and an associate editor of The Journal of the Learning Sciences from 1999-2001.

He was the subject of a PBS documentary titled The Interaction Cowboy (2023), directed by his son.

== Awards ==
- Inaugural Fellow, International Society for the Learning Sciences, 2017.
- Doctorate honoris causa, Faculty of Education, Götesborgs Universitet, 2013.
- Outstanding Scholar Award, SIU School of Medicine, 2010.
- Spencer Post-Doctoral Fellow, National Academy of Education, 1993-1995.

== Selected bibliography ==
=== Books ===
- Koschmann, T. (Ed.) (2011). Theories of learning and studies of instructional practice. New York: Springer.
- Koschmann, T., Hall, R., & Miyake, N. (Eds.)(2002). CSCL 2: Carrying forward the conversation.
- Koschmann, T. (Ed.)(1996). CSCL: Theory and practice of an emerging paradigm. Mahwah, NJ: Lawrence Erlbaum.
- Koschmann, T. (1990). The Common Lisp companion. New York: John Wiley & Sons.
