= CLISP =

Version of programming language Common Lisp

- Original authors: Bruno Haible, Michael Stoll
- Developer: Various
- Release: April 1987; 39 years ago
- Stable release: 2.49 / July 7, 2010; 16 years ago
- Operating system: Cross-platform
- Available in: Common Lisp
- Type: Compiler, runtime
- License: GNU General Public License
- Website: www.gnu.org/software/clisp/
- Repository: gitlab.com/gnu-clisp/clisp.git

CLISP is an implementation of the programming language Common Lisp originally developed by Bruno Haible and Michael Stoll for the Atari ST. Today it supports the Unix and Microsoft Windows operating systems.

CLISP includes an interpreter, a bytecode compiler, debugger, socket interface, high-level foreign language interface, strong internationalization support, and two object systems: Common Lisp Object System (CLOS) and metaobject protocol (MOP).

It is written in C and Common Lisp. It is now part of the GNU Project and is free software, available under the terms of the GNU General Public License (GPL).

== History ==
Haible did not originally intend to distribute CLISP under the GPL, but in a well-publicised email exchange with Richard Stallman, he eventually agreed to do so. The issue at stake was whether CLISP was a derivative work of the GNU readline library.

== Ports ==
CLISP is extremely portable, running on almost all Unix-based operating systems as well as on Microsoft Windows. Although interpreting bytecode is usually slower than running compiled native binaries, this is not always a major issue (especially in applications like Web development where I/O is the bottleneck). CLISP is also easier to set up than other popular FOSS Common Lisps such as SBCL.

== Adoption ==
Paul Graham used CLISP to run the software for his Viaweb startup. Viaweb was an early web application; portions of it still exist as Yahoo! Stores, the base for Yahoo Shopping.

Conrad Barski's Land of Lisp uses some CLISP-specific functions in the textbook exercises.

== See also ==
- GNU Common Lisp—another GNU Project Common Lisp implementation
