= Stephen Slade =

American eye surgeon

Stephen Slade is an American eye surgeon who performed the first LASIK (laser-assisted in situ keratomileusis, or laser eye surgery) in the United States in 1991 along with Dr. Stephen Brint. He was a lead investigator for panel approval at the FDA for both the Crystalens and the implantable contact lens. Slade performed the first laser cataract surgery in the United States in 2010. He also performed the first Raindrop Corneal Inlay in the United States in both the clinical trials and commercially. He continues to participate in and consult for many FDA clinical trials.

Slade was the featured surgeon on the Emmy Award-winning PBS documentary "20/10 by 2010?" narrated by Walter Cronkite.
