= Pyramid 2000 =

1979 video game

- Developer(s): Robert Arnstein
- Publisher(s): Radio Shack
- Platform(s): TRS-80 Model I, TRS-80 Color Computer
- Release: 1979
- Genre(s): Interactive fiction
- Mode(s): Single-player

Pyramid 2000 is an interactive fiction game. The game is an altered version of Colossal Cave that takes advantage of an Egyptian setting, re-theming some of the locations, objects, and puzzles. For instance, the "little bird" from Adventure is now a "bird statue" and the "clam" is a "sarcophagus."

== Development ==
The system was written by Robert Arnstein using a custom p-code machine with 32 instructions. Unlike the Infocom z-machine, this machine was specific to this game (e.g., command 13 asserted the player was carrying the emerald and only the emerald).

== Reception ==
It was panned by 80 Micro: "This game is yet another example of Radio Shack's inability to deal with the consumer in a consumer's market... Pyramid suffers from the lack of a command word base... You can try typing HELP, but don't expect any."
