= GNU Common Lisp =

Implementation of Common Lisp

- Developer: GNU Project
- Stable release: 2.7.1 / April 11, 2025; 17 months ago
- Operating system: Unix-like, Microsoft Windows
- Type: Interpreter, compiler
- License: LGPLv2
- Website: www.gnu.org/software/gcl/
- Repository: git.savannah.gnu.org/cgit/gcl.git

GNU Common Lisp (GCL) is the GNU Project's ANSI Common Lisp compiler, an evolutionary development of Kyoto Common Lisp. It produces native object code by first generating C code and then calling a C compiler.

GCL is the implementation of choice for several large projects including the mathematical tools Maxima, AXIOM, HOL88, and ACL2. GCL runs under eleven different architectures on Linux, and under FreeBSD, Solaris, Mac OS X, and Microsoft Windows.

Last stable release of GCL is of April 11, 2025.

== See also ==
- CLISP – another GNU Project Common Lisp implementation
