= Steel Bank Common Lisp =

Free Common Lisp implementation

SBCL
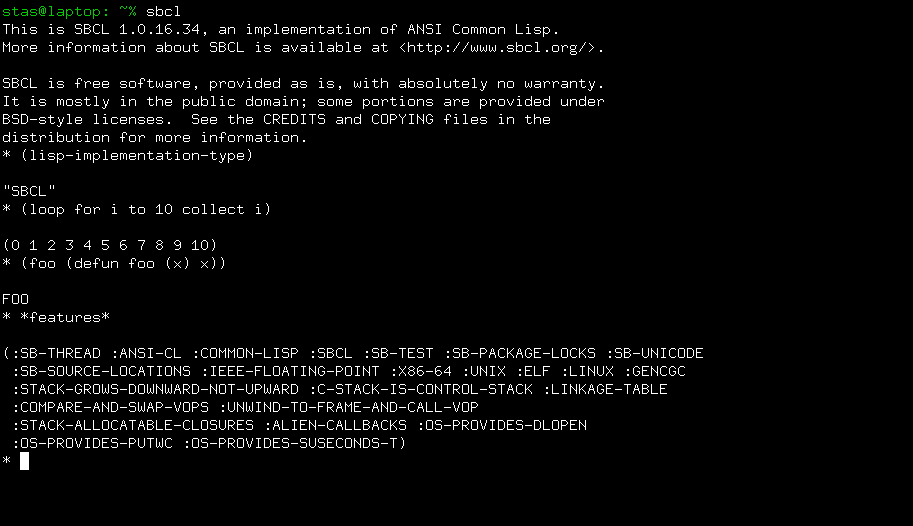
- Original author: Forked by William Newman from CMUCL
- Developer: Various
- Release: December 1999; 26 years ago (fork)
- Stable release: 2.6.9 / 26 September 2026; 43 days ago
- Operating system: Linux, Solaris, DragonFly BSD, FreeBSD, NetBSD, OpenBSD, Mac OS X, Microsoft Windows
- Platform: Cross-platform
- Available in: Common Lisp
- Type: Compiler and runtime
- License: Public Domain, with parts covered by the MIT License and BSD License (sans advertising clause)
- Website: www.sbcl.org
- Repository: sourceforge.net/p/sbcl/sbcl/

Steel Bank Common Lisp (SBCL) is a free and open-source Common Lisp implementation that features a high-performance native compiler, Unicode support and threading. It is open source software, with a permissive license. In addition to the compiler and runtime system for ANSI Common Lisp, it provides an interactive environment including a debugger, a statistical profiler, a code coverage tool, and many other extensions.

The name "Steel Bank Common Lisp" is a reference to Carnegie Mellon University Common Lisp from which SBCL forked: Andrew Carnegie made his fortune in the steel industry and Andrew Mellon was a successful banker.

== History ==
SBCL descends from CMUCL (created at Carnegie Mellon University), which is itself descended from Spice Lisp, including early implementations for the Mach operating system on the IBM RT PC, and the Three Rivers Computing Corporation PERQ computer, in the 1980s.

William Newman originally announced SBCL as a variant of CMUCL in December 1999. The main point of divergence at the time was a clean bootstrapping procedure: CMUCL requires an already compiled executable binary of itself to compile the CMUCL source code, whereas SBCL supported bootstrapping from theoretically any ANSI-compliant Common Lisp implementation.

SBCL became a SourceForge project in September 2000. The original rationale for the fork was to continue the initial work done by Newman without destabilizing CMUCL which was at the time already a mature and much-used implementation. The forking was amicable, and there have since then been significant flows of code and other cross-pollination between the two projects.

Since then SBCL has attracted several developers, been ported to multiple hardware architectures and operating systems, and undergone many changes and enhancements: while it has dropped support for several CMUCL extensions that it considers beyond the scope of the project (such as the Motif interface) it has also developed many new ones, including native threading and Unicode support.

Version 1.0 was released in November 2006, and active development continues.

William Newman stepped down as project administrator for SBCL in April 2008. Several other developers have taken over interim management of releases for the time being.

For the tenth anniversary of SBCL, a Workshop was organized.

Version 2.0.0 was released on 29 December 2019 for the 20th anniversary of SBCL, with no major breaking changes.
