= Spice Lisp =

- Paradigms: Multi-paradigm: procedural, functional, object-oriented, meta, reflective, generic
- Family: Lisp
- Designed by: Scott E. Fahlman
- Developer: Carnegie Mellon University (CMU) Spice Lisp Group
- First appeared: 1980; 45 years ago
- Final release: Final / 1985; 40 years ago
- Typing discipline: Dynamic, strong
- Scope: Lexical, optional dynamic
- Implementation language: Spice Lisp
- Platform: PDP-10, PERQ
- OS: TOPS-10, Accent
- Website: cmucl.org

Influenced by
- Lisp, Common Lisp

Influenced
- CMU Common Lisp (CMUCL)

Spice Lisp (Scientific Personal Integrated Computing Environment) is a programming language, a dialect of Lisp. Its implementation, originally written by Carnegie Mellon University's (CMU) Spice Lisp Group, targeted the microcode of the 16-bit workstation PERQ, and its operating system Accent. It used that workstation's microcode abilities (and provided microcodes for the languages Pascal, C, and Ada) to implement a stack machine architecture to store its data structures as 32-bit objects and to enable run time type-checking. It would later be popular on other workstations.

Spice Lisp evolved into an implementation of Common Lisp, and was renamed CMU Common Lisp (CMUCL).
