= Embeddable Common Lisp =

Computer programming language

- Paradigms: Multi-paradigm: procedural, functional, object-oriented, meta, reflective, generic
- Family: Lisp
- Designed by: Giuseppe Attardi
- Developers: Daniel Kochmański, Marius Gerbershagen
- First appeared: 1 January 1995; 31 years ago
- Stable release: 26.3.27 / 27 March 2026; 7 months ago
- Typing discipline: Dynamic, strong
- Implementation language: C, Common Lisp
- Platform: ARM, x86
- OS: Unix-like, Android, Windows
- License: LGPL 2.1+
- Website: ecl.common-lisp.dev

Influenced by
- Lisp, Common Lisp, C

Embeddable Common Lisp (ECL) is a small implementation of the ANSI Common Lisp programming language that can be used stand-alone or embedded in extant applications written in C. It creates OS-native executables and libraries (i.e. Executable and Linkable Format (ELF) files on unix) from Common Lisp code, and runs on most platforms that support a C compiler. The ECL runtime is a dynamically loadable library for use by applications. It is distributed as free software under a GNU Lesser Public License (LGPL) 2.1+.

It includes a runtime system, and two compilers, a bytecode interpreter allowing applications to be deployed where no C compiler is expected, and an intermediate language type, which compiles Common Lisp to C for a more efficient runtime. The latter also features a native foreign function interface (FFI), that supports inline C as part of Common Lisp. Inline C FFI combined with Common Lisp macros, custom Lisp setf expansions and compiler-macros, result in a custom compile-time C preprocessor.
