= Common Lisp HyperSpec =

HTML technical standard document

The Common Lisp HyperSpec is a technical standard document written in the hypertext format Hypertext Markup Language (HTML). It is not the American National Standards Institute (ANSI) Common Lisp standard, but is based on it, with permission from ANSI and the International Committee for Information Technology Standards (INCITS, X3). Originally developed by Kent Pitman at Harlequin, it is now copyrighted by LispWorks Ltd. It is approximately 15 megabytes (MB) of data in 2,300 files which contain approximately 105,000 hyperlinks.

The HyperSpec is used by many Common Lisp development environments (examples: LispWorks, the Superior Lisp Interaction Mode for Emacs (SLIME) for looking up reference information on the constructs of ANSI Common Lisp. The HyperSpec is also available for download.

Before the ANSI Common Lisp standard, the book Common Lisp the Language had been used as a Common Lisp standard reference.

Allegro Common Lisp has its own hypertext version of the ANSI Common Lisp standard.
