= Common Lisp the Language =

1984 reference book by Guy Steele

- Title page for Common Lisp the Language (1984)
- Author: Guy L. Steele Jr.; Scott Fahlman; Richard P. Gabriel; David A. Moon; Daniel Weinreb
- Language: English
- Subject: Common Lisp
- Genre: Reference
- Publication date: 1984
- ISBN: 0-932376-41-X

Common Lisp the Language is a reference book by Guy L. Steele about a set of technical standards and programming languages named Common Lisp.

== History ==
=== Before standardizing ===
The first edition (Digital Press, 1984; ISBN 0-932376-41-X; 465 pages) was written by Guy L. Steele Jr., Scott E. Fahlman, Richard P. Gabriel, David A. Moon, and Daniel L. Weinreb. It served as the basis for the Common Lisp technical standard by the American National Standards Institute (ANSI), and is thus termed ANSI Common Lisp.

=== During standardizing ===
The second edition (Digital Press, 1990; ISBN 1-55558-041-6; 1029 pages) was written by Guy L. Steele Jr. It reflected the then-current status of the standardizing process and documented important new features such as Common Lisp Object System (CLOS), the loop macro, and conditions. It also has a chapter on series and generators.

=== After standardizing ===
The ANSI Common Lisp standard was published in 1994 and differs from the language dialects described in Common Lisp the Language (1984) and Common Lisp the Language, Second Edition (1990). Substantive additions and deletions were made between the time of the Second Edition and the final version of ANSI Common Lisp. Also, series and generators were discussed in appendix matter of the Second Edition but were not a part of any working draft nor the final version of ANSI Common Lisp.

Although ANSI Common Lisp and the language dialects described by the two editions of Common Lisp the Language differ, the ANSI Common Lisp specification indirectly acknowledges the practical importance of Common Lisp the Language (first and second edition) by explicitly suggesting the reserved words (keywords) :cltl1 and :cltl2 for potential inclusion on the *features* list, allowing conditionals to be added to code that must interoperate between ANSI Common Lisp and those other dialects.

== See also ==
- Common Lisp HyperSpec (hypertext version of the ANSI Common Lisp standard)
