= Full-screen writing program =

Text editor that occupies the full display

In computing, a full-screen writing program or distraction-free editor is a text editor that occupies the full display with the purpose of isolating the writer from the operating system (OS) and other applications. In this way, one should be able to focus on the writing alone, with no distractions from the OS and a cluttered interface. Often, distraction-free editors feature a dark background and a text field, with lighter colored text. However, most distraction-free editors include customisable user interfaces. Some editors support rich text editing.

== List of full screen editors ==
=== Free and open-source ===
Name	License	Linux	Other supported operating systems	Programming language	Toolkit	Spell checker	Syntax highlighting	WYSIWYG	Notable aspects, references
Acme	LPL	Yes	Plan 9, Mac OS, Windows						Mouse chording; supports sending selected text through pipelines of programs; extensible & scriptable via any language.
CodeRoom	GPLv3	Yes	Mac OS, Windows	C++	Qt	No	QSyntaxHighlighter		Supports syntax highlighting.
GNU Emacs	GPLv3	Yes	Unix, Mac OS, Windows	C, Emacs Lisp	curses, GTK+	Yes	Yes	Yes	Supports syntax highlighting, programmable, several distraction-free packages available.
FocusWriter	GPLv3	Yes	Linux, Mac OS Windows	C++	Qt	Enchant			Highly customizable, has basic .odt format support.
gedit	GPLv2	Yes	Cross-platform	C	GTK+	Enchant	GtkSourceView	Unicode	Full-screen with F11; part of GNOME Core Applications.
KoalaWriter	GPLv3	Yes	Mac OS, Windows	C++	Qt	No	No	No	Clone of OmmWriter.
Marave	GPLv2	Yes	No	Python	Qt	Enchant	GNU source-highlight		Similar to OmmWriter, CreaWriter.
PyRoom	GPLv3	Yes	Mac OS	Python	GTK+	No	No	No	
QuiEdit	GPLv3	Yes	Windows	Python	Qt	Hunspell	Yes	Markdown	Basic text formatting.
RubyRoom	GPLv2	Yes	No	Ruby	GTK+	No	No	No	Latest version from 2009.
TextRoom	GPLv3	Yes	Mac OS, Windows	C++	Qt (+GLib)	Hunspell			Supports rich text.
THE	GPLv2	Yes	Mac OS X, OS/2, Unix, Windows	Rexx		Yes	Yes	No	
Vim	Vim License	Yes	Cross-platform	C		Yes	Yes		Distraction-free plugins available.

=== Freeware ===
Name	Operating system support	Notable aspects, references
Calmly Writer	ChromeOS, Google Chrome browser	WYSIWYG, image embedding, OpenDyslexic mode.
FORCEdraft	Windows	Text editor that won't exit until the user's goal is reached.
DarkRoom	Windows	Clone of WriteRoom for Windows .NET.
JDarkRoom	Linux, Mac OS, Windows	Clone of DarkRoom written in Java.
Poe	Windows 8 (only)	Word count goals, writing timers, auto-correct and resource links.
Writemonkey	Windows	Supports Markdown Extra, Textile, WikiCreole. Donors can access plugins including corkboard, timer.

=== Proprietary ===
Name	Operating system support	Notable aspects, references
Bloom Editor	Windows	Uses 3D rendering for special effects and dynamic visual themes. Has a free limited version.
CreaWriter	Windows	Clone of OmmWriter for Windows; has limited free version.
Frost	Mac OS, Windows	Plays thematic ambient music, free to use, live word counter, downloading option.
iA Writer	Mac OS, Windows, Android	Lightweight, has iCloud and Dropbox integration, iPad and iPhone version, Focus Mode, and Markdown support, light and dark writing modes, live rendering/preview, syntax highlighting, style check.
ISPF	MVS through z/OS, VM/SP through z/VM, z/VSE	Latest version of Structured Programming Facility (SPF).
Moopato	Mac OS and Windows	Markdown editor and e-book publishing app.
NaNoScriBe	Windows	Rich text, on-screen word count, goals and timers. Built-in NaNoWriMo stats page.
OmmWriter	Mac OS, Windows	Supports images as backgrounds, and a player for ambient music.
Prime Draft	Mac OS, Windows	Writing mode that ensures forward progress and the avoidance of pre-emptive editing. Built-in calendar and writing target tracking.
SPF	OS/VS2, VM/SP	Early full screen editor for IBM mainframes. Predecessor to ISPF.
Sublime Text	Linux, Mac OS, Windows	Customisable, for programmers, has free trial version.
WonderPen	Windows, macOS, Linux	
Write!	Windows	Markdown, spell-checker, cloud storage, sessions and folders scheme, RTL support.
Write Onward!	Windows	Fullscreen writing software disallowing editing, copying or pasting text to let writers focus solely on the writing process.
WriteRoom	Mac OS	Simple.
XEDIT	VM/SP through z/VM	Successor to EDGAR and current z/VM editor.
Xiosis Scribe	Windows	
ZenWriter	Windows	Simple, with background images and ambient music.

== Features ==
=== Rich text support ===
Some distraction-free editors support rich text editing. These include CreaWriter, TextRoom, and WriteRoom. In some cases, this feature turned off per default and must be set by a user.

=== Syntax highlighting ===
Currently, only a few distraction-free editors support syntax highlighting. CodeRoom is an open source project with the purpose of creating a distraction-free code editor with customisable highlighting schemes. The latest version of Marave supports syntax highlighting. Sublime Text supports a distraction-free full-screen view. Packages exist for GNU Emacs that turn off various features and reformat the display to a distraction-free layout while retaining syntax highlighting and other features familiar to Emacs users.

=== Aids to writing ===
Word count is a common feature in these editors. Other aids can include spell checkers, auto-corrections and quick text templates.

=== Other Features ===
Many of the programs include timers to pace writing. FocusWriter and WriteMonkey, among others, include typewriter sound effects.

== See also ==
- Text editor
