= Virastyar =

- Developer: Omid Kashefi
- Initial release: February 2, 2011; 15 years ago
- Stable release: 3.5 / August 15, 2015; 10 years ago
- Preview release: 4.0 Beta / August 29, 2015; 10 years ago
- Written in: C#, Visual Basic for Applications
- Operating system: Microsoft Windows
- Platform: Microsoft Word, .NET Framework, Visual Studio Tools for Applications
- Size: 59.1 MB
- Available in: Persian
- Type: Spell checker, plug-in
- License: GNU General Public License
- Website: virastyar.ir

Virastyar (Persian: ویراستیار, meaning "editing assistant") is a Persian add-in for Microsoft Word that performs Persian spell checking, character standardization, Pinglish transliteration, punctuation correction and calendar conversion. It can conjugate approximately 46,000 simple verb tense, and use inflection and morphological rules to recognize possible extensions of a word. It covers approximately 2,800 non-verbal inflections for nouns, adjectives, adverbs, prepositions, numerals, classifiers, and pronouns.

Virastyar is mostly coded in Microsoft Visual C# using .NET Framework and is a free software, released under the GNU General Public License.

== See also ==
- Hungarian spellcheckers
- Hunspell
- GNU Aspell
- Enchant
- Ispell
- MySpell
- Pspell
