= Hexl =

Hexl may refer to:

- Hexl, a dachshund owned by Wilhelm II, German Emperor
- Hexl-mode, in GNU Emacs
