= XED =

XED may refer to:

- XED-AM, the call letters of the first radio station in Mexico to be considered a border blaster.
- Cross elasticity of demand, an economics term which measures the responsiveness of the demand of a good to a change in the price of another good.
- Xed, a small and lightweight text editor.
- XED, an execute instruction on the GE/Honeywell-6xx/6xxx
