= GNU Oleo =

Spreadsheet program

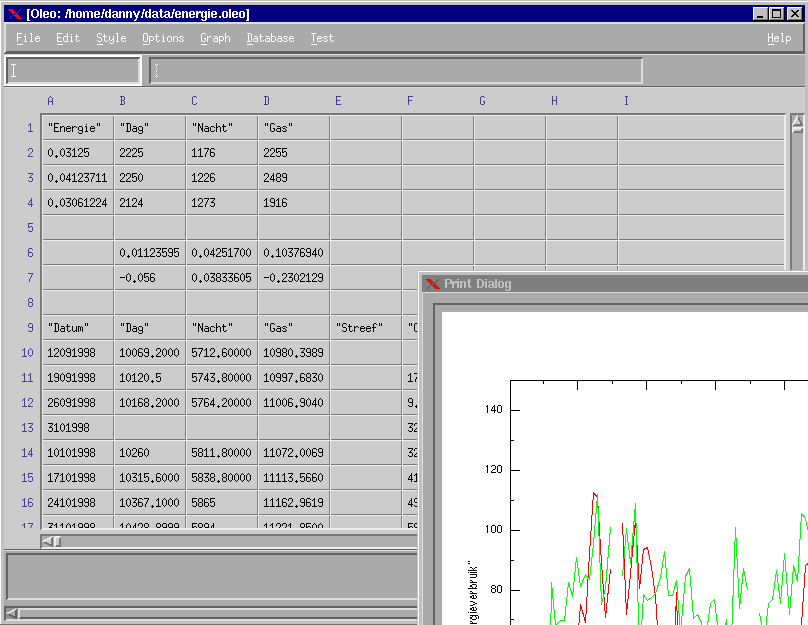
- Oleo with a Motif GUI
- Original authors: Tom Lord,
- Initial release: 1992; 34 years ago
- Final release: 1.6.16 / 10 March 1999
- Preview release: 1.99.16 / 10 March 2001
- Written in: C
- Type: Spreadsheet
- License: GPL-3.0-or-later
- Website: www.gnu.org/software/oleo/oleo.html

GNU Oleo is a discontinued lightweight free software spreadsheet originally designed as a text-based spreadsheet using the curses library. The last development version of Oleo, 1.99.16, was released in 2001.

== History ==
The project was started in 1992 by Tom Lord, and became part of the GNU initiative around 1994. At the time, the only open source alternative was the older text-based sc, both products having similar functionality to early versions of Lotus 1-2-3 or Microsoft Excel. Oleo's key bindings were inspired from the Unix world, and similar to those used by the emacs editor, which frustrated novice users. Oleo and sc were the first Unix spreadsheet applications with a graphical user interface. Because Oleo was officially part of the GNU project, it was dubbed "GNU's response to Excel" in a 1996 article in iX magazine. It claimed to be "better than the high priced spread", a reference to old oleomargarine advertisements promoting margarine over the more expensive butter. Oleo also worked well in a BSD environment; a FreeBSD port was available.

By 1995, sc had acquired an X Window front-end called xspread, which added graphics capabilities. In 1998, Oleo acquired a Motif-like GUI, relying on the royalty-free LessTif widget set. A GTK version was also under development. By 1999 Oleo was still judged as "not completely usable", due to the awkward graphical interface lacking in user friendliness like X-style cut, copy, and paste or tear-off menus. In the 1995 version, to type a number into a cell the user had to hit the "=" key first, similar to the early versions of Excel. This was later changed to typing a number directly, although typing a number in a cell that already contains one appends to it rather than overwrite it. Graphics are drawn using the device-independent library libplot, the centerpiece of the GNU plotutils. Oleo offers spreadsheet access to the GNU Scientific Library, a large collection of mathematical functions. It also offers some database connectivity, allowing access to MySQL database via queries, Xbase and DBF file access. It has support for macro programming, and for printing purposes it supports ASCII and PostScript output. Still, by 2000 it could not import Excel spreadsheets, while newer open source alternatives like Gnumeric offered this feature, and could also import Oleo spreadsheets.

Oleo was still recommended as a console spreadsheet application in a 2005 article in Linux.com, but the reviewer warns that "I had expected Oleo to be more intuitive, but I needed multiple sessions with the info file before I could use it proficiently. Even cell reference syntax was not what I had expected." By default, Oleo uses numbers for both rows and columns; a cell reference uses a syntax like r12c26. A single Oleo process does not support the display of more than one file at a time, but GNU screen or multiple terminals can be used as a work-around. Oleo supports editing the same spreadsheet in concurrent application instances.
