= Pspell =

Free and open source spell checker

- Final release: 0.12.2 / 2001-05-30
- Written in: C
- Type: Spell checker
- License: GNU Lesser General Public License
- Website: https://sourceforge.net/projects/pspell

Pspell (Portable Spell Checker Interface Library) is a program meant to provide a generic interface to the system spelling checking libraries. It was, and sometimes still is, used in computer programming such as C, and is licensed under the GNU Lesser General Public License.

Pspell has not been updated since 2001, but is still available on SourceForge at its project page. It has been replaced by GNU Aspell. PHP’s Pspell extension, while retaining its current name, now uses the Aspell library.

== See also ==
- GNU Aspell
- Hunspell
- Ispell
- MySpell
- Virastyar
