= FocusWriter =

Distraction-free word processor for Linux, Windows, and macOS

- Release: October 6, 2008; 17 years ago
- Stable release: 1.9.0 / February 10, 2026; 4 months ago
- Platform: Linux, Windows, MacOS
- Type: Text editor
- License: GPL-2.0-or-later
- Website: gottcode.org/focuswriter/
- Repository: github.com/gottcode/focuswriter

FocusWriter is a distraction-free text editor for Microsoft Windows and Linux. An old version (1.7.6) still can be used on MacOS.

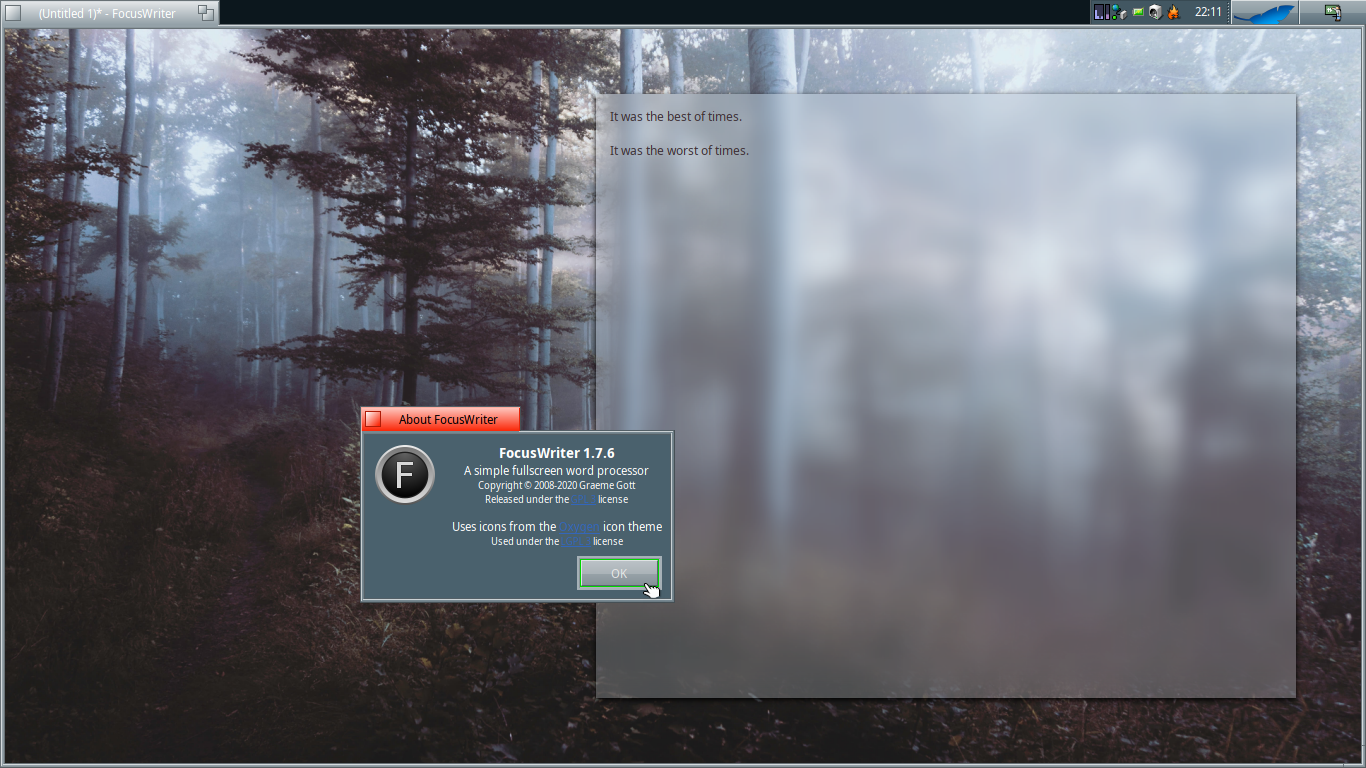
Screenshot of FocusWriter running under Haiku OS

== See also ==
- List of text editors
- Comparison of text editors
- Full-screen writing program
