= Words (Unix) =

Unix file listing dictionary words

words is a standard file on Unix and Unix-like operating systems, and is simply a newline-delimited list of dictionary words. It is used, for instance, by spell-checking programs.

The words file is usually stored in /usr/share/dict/words but may appear in other locations.

On Debian and Ubuntu, the words file is provided by the wordlist package, or its provider packages wbritish, wamerican, etc. On Fedora, Alpine Linux and Arch Linux, the words file is provided by the words package. The words package is sourced from data from the Moby Project, a public domain compilation of words.
