= Xed =

Text editor forked from Pluma

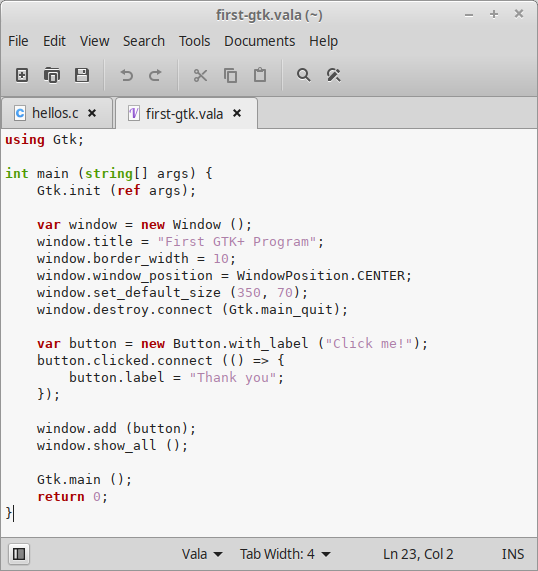
- Xed showing language highlighting
- Developer: Linux Mint
- Release: January 16, 2016; 10 years ago
- Stable release: 3.8.9 / February 11, 2026; 8 months ago
- Written in: C
- Operating system: Linux
- Available in: 105 languages
- Type: Text editor
- License: GPL-2.0-or-later
- Website: github.com/linuxmint/xed
- Repository: github.com/linuxmint/xed

Xed is a text editor forked from Pluma and is the default text editor in Linux Mint.

Xed is a graphical application which supports editing multiple text files in one window via tabs. It fully supports international text through its use of the Unicode UTF-8 encoding. As a general-purpose text editor, Xed supports most standard editor features, and emphasizes simplicity and ease of use. Its core feature set includes syntax highlighting of source code, auto indentation, and printing support with print preview.

== Features ==
- "xed was introduced in Mac OS X 10.5 with Xcode 3.0."
- "accepts standard GTK options"
- choose character encoding
- edit copy of web page from URL
- settings are all stored as gsettings keys
- Keyboard shortcut
- tabs listed on Menu, side pane, tabs
- UTF-8 support
- configurable auto-indentation
- file statistics (lines, words, characters, bytes)
- Syntax highlighting
- find and replace with regular expressions
- Print preview and printing
- File comparison
- File revert
- edit undo
- plugin support (gedit-like format)
- modeline plugin
- Python support
- plugins include spell checker, case changes, line sort, and insert date/time
- Edit multiple file tabs
- line sorting.

== See also ==
- List of text editors
- Comparison of text editors
