= James Gosling =

Canadian computer scientist (born 1955)

James Gosling OC
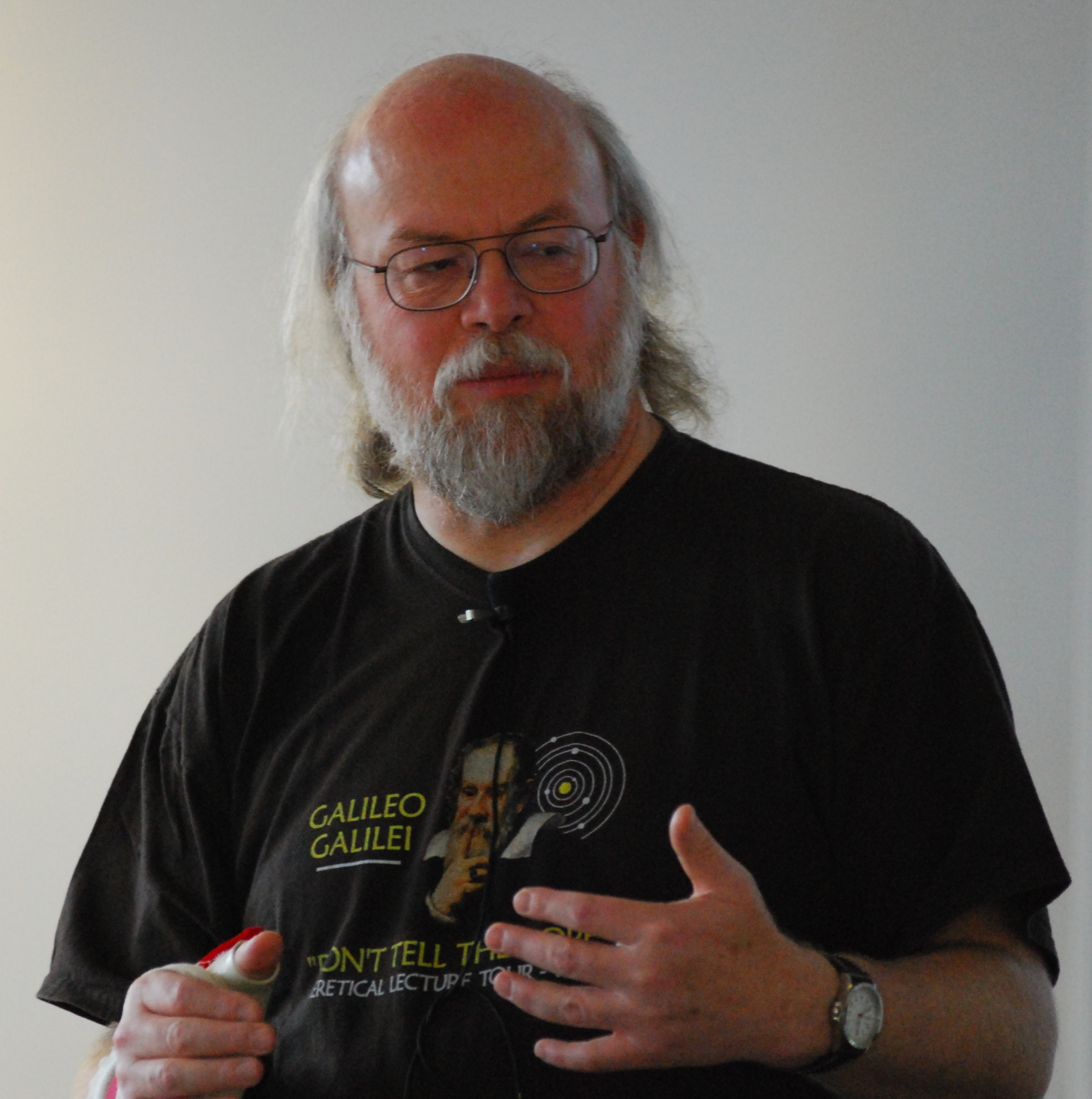
- Gosling in 2010
- Born: James Arthur Gosling; May 19, 1955 (age 71); Calgary, Alberta, Canada
- Education: University of Calgary (BSc); Carnegie Mellon University (MA, PhD)
- Known for: Java (programming language) Gosling Emacs
- Children: 2
- Awards: Officer of the Order of Canada; IEEE John von Neumann Medal; The Economist Innovation Award; NAE Foreign Member; Fellow Computer History Museum
- Scientific career
- Workplaces: Sun Microsystems; Oracle Corporation; Google; Liquid Robotics; Amazon Web Services
- Thesis: Algebraic Constraints (1983)
- Doctoral advisor: Bob Sproull and Raj Reddy

James Arthur Gosling (born 19 May 1955) is a Canadian computer scientist, best known as the founder and lead designer behind the Java programming language.

Gosling was elected a member of the National Academy of Engineering in 2004 for the conception and development of the architecture for the Java programming language and for contributions to windowing systems.

== Early life ==
Gosling was born in Calgary, Alberta, to Joyce Morrison and Dave Gosling. He is of English, Welsh, Scottish, and Icelandic descent. Gosling attended William Aberhart High School. While in high school, he wrote some of the software to analyze data from the ISIS 2 satellite, working for the University of Calgary physics department. received a Bachelor of Science from the University of Calgary and his M.A. and Ph.D. from Carnegie Mellon University, all in computer science. He wrote a version of Emacs called Gosling Emacs (Gosmacs) while working toward his doctorate and also the sc (spreadsheet calculator) in 1981. He built a multi-processor version of Unix for a 16-way computer system while at Carnegie Mellon University, before joining Sun Microsystems.

== Career and contributions ==
Gosling joined Sun Microsystems in 1984, where he worked for the next 26 years. At Sun he invented an early Unix windowing system called NeWS, which became a lesser-used alternative to the still used X Window System, because Sun did not give it an open source license.

He is known as the father of the Java programming language. He got the idea for the Java VM while writing a program to port software from a PERQ by translating Perq Q-Code to VAX assembler and emulating the hardware. He is generally credited with having invented the Java programming language in 1994. He created the original design of Java and implemented the language's original compiler and virtual machine. Gosling traces the origins of the approach to his early graduate student days, when he created a p-code virtual machine for the lab's DEC VAX computer, so that his professor could run programs written in UCSD Pascal. In the work leading to Java at Sun, he saw that architecture-neutral execution for widely distributed programs could be achieved by implementing a similar philosophy: always program for the same virtual machine.

Another contribution of Gosling's was co-writing the "bundle" program, known as "shar", a utility thoroughly detailed in Brian Kernighan and Rob Pike's book The Unix Programming Environment.

He left Sun Microsystems on April 2, 2010, after it was acquired by the Oracle Corporation, citing reductions in pay, status, and decision-making ability, along with change of role and ethical challenges. He has since taken a very critical stance towards Oracle in interviews, noting that "during the integration meetings between Sun and Oracle, where we were being grilled about the patent situation between Sun and Google, we could see the Oracle lawyer's eyes sparkle." He clarified his position during the Oracle v. Google trial over Android: "While I have differences with Oracle, in this case they are in the right. Google totally slimed Sun. We were all really disturbed, even Jonathan [Schwartz]: he just decided to put on a happy face and tried to turn lemons into lemonade, which annoyed a lot of folks at Sun." However, he approved of the court's ruling that APIs should not be copyrightable.

In March 2011, Gosling joined Google. Six months later, he followed his colleague Bill Vass and joined a startup called Liquid Robotics. In late 2016, Liquid Robotics was acquired by Boeing. Following the acquisition, Gosling left Liquid Robotics to work at Amazon Web Services as Distinguished Engineer in May 2017.

He has worked as an advisor at the Scala company Lightbend, Independent Director at Jelastic, and Strategic Advisor for Eucalyptus, and is a board member of DIRTT Environmental Solutions.

On July 2, 2024, Gosling announced he had officially retired.

== Awards ==
For his achievement, the National Academy of Engineering in the United States elected him as a Foreign Associate member.

- 2002: awarded The Economist Innovation Award.
- 2002: awarded The Flame Award USENIX Lifetime Achievement Award.
- 2007: made an Officer of the Order of Canada. The Order is Canada's second highest civilian honor. Officers are the second highest grade within the Order.
- 2013: became a fellow of the Association for Computing Machinery.
- 2015: awarded IEEE John von Neumann Medal
- 2019: named a Computer History Museum Fellow for the conception, design, and implementation of the Java programming language.

== Books ==
- Ken Arnold, James Gosling, David Holmes, The Java Programming Language, Fourth Edition, Addison-Wesley Professional, 2005, ISBN 0-321-34980-6
- James Gosling, Bill Joy, Guy L. Steele Jr., Gilad Bracha, The Java Language Specification, Third Edition, Addison-Wesley Professional, 2005, ISBN 0-321-24678-0
- Ken Arnold, James Gosling, David Holmes, The Java Programming Language, Third Edition, Addison-Wesley Professional, 2000, ISBN 0-201-70433-1
- James Gosling, Bill Joy, Guy L. Steele Jr., Gilad Bracha, The Java Language Specification, Second Edition, Addison-Wesley, 2000, ISBN 0-201-31008-2
- Gregory Bollella (Editor), Benjamin Brosgol, James Gosling, Peter Dibble, Steve Furr, David Hardin, Mark Turnbull, The Real-Time Specification for Java, Addison Wesley Longman, 2000, ISBN 0-201-70323-8
- Ken Arnold, James Gosling, The Java programming language Second Edition, Addison-Wesley, 1997, ISBN 0-201-31006-6
- Ken Arnold, James Gosling, The Java programming language, Addison-Wesley, 1996, ISBN 0-201-63455-4
- James Gosling, Bill Joy, Guy L. Steele Jr., The Java Language Specification, Addison Wesley Publishing Company, 1996, ISBN 0-201-63451-1
- James Gosling, Frank Yellin, The Java Team, The Java Application Programming Interface, Volume 2: Window Toolkit and Applets, Addison-Wesley, 1996, ISBN 0-201-63459-7
- James Gosling, Frank Yellin, The Java Team, The Java Application Programming Interface, Volume 1: Core Packages, Addison-Wesley, 1996, ISBN 0-201-63453-8
- James Gosling, Henry McGilton, The Java language Environment: A white paper, Sun Microsystems, 1996
- James Gosling, David S. H. Rosenthal, Michelle J. Arden, The NeWS Book: An Introduction to the Network/Extensible Window System (Sun Technical Reference Library), Springer, 1989, ISBN 0-387-96915-2

== See also ==
- History of Java
- Article on James Gosling in The Canadian Encyclopedia
