= GNU Aspell =

Free software spell checker

- Developer: GNU Aspell developers
- Written in: C++
- Operating system: Cross-platform
- Type: Spell checker
- License: GNU LGPL
- Website: aspell.net
- Repository: git.savannah.gnu.org/cgit/aspell.git

GNU Aspell, usually called just Aspell, is a free software spell checker designed to replace Ispell. It is the standard spell checker for the GNU operating system. It also compiles for other Unix-like operating systems and Windows. The main program is licensed under the GNU Lesser General Public License (GNU LGPL), the documentation under the GNU Free Documentation License (GNU FDL). Dictionaries for it are available for about 70 languages. The primary maintainer is Kevin Atkinson.

== Comparison to Ispell ==
Unlike Ispell, Aspell can easily check UTF-8 documents without having to use a special dictionary. But the mechanism behind this is still 8-bit. Aspell will also do its best to respect the current locale setting. Other advantages over Ispell include support for using multiple dictionaries at once and intelligently handling personal dictionaries when more than one Aspell process is open at once. However, Ispell follows the Unix convention of being a command applied to a file, e.g., ispell text-file-with-spelling-errors, whereas Aspell requires other command-line options, and the "--help" option is more comprehensive. Sample uses include:

- Interactively run through the text_file checking the spelling (aspell check text_file).
- Allow typing a word (followed by newline and Ctrl-D) to find words that sound the same (aspell soundslike).

== Windows ports ==
As of July 2017, the latest official Windows port of GNU Aspell was still 32-bit version 0.50.3 (Dec 2002), with dictionaries of similar age. The developer says he has "no time and very little interest in maintaining a Windows port", and has been looking for somebody to maintain it. However, the LyX project maintains a separate fork of Aspell for Windows and dictionaries, and says "the LyX project has long solved the Windows packaging problem by forking Aspell." LyX is being maintained and as of October 2023 the latest version is 2.3.7, dated 7 January 2023.

The regularly updated Cygwin port of aspell can also be used in Windows and it is the latest version.

== Integration ==
Aspell has been integrated into software such as Gajim, LyX, Notepad++, Claws Mail and previously Pidgin, Opera, gedit and AbiWord.

== See also ==
- Enchant
- Hunspell
- Ispell
- MySpell
- Pspell
- Virastyar
