= Hunspell =

Spell checker for complex languages

- Developer: László Németh
- Stable release: 1.7.3 / 5 May 2026; 3 months ago
- Written in: C++
- Operating system: Cross-platform
- Type: Spell checker
- License: GNU Lesser General Public License and Mozilla Public License
- Website: hunspell.github.io
- Repository: github.com/hunspell/hunspell

Hunspell is a spell checker and morphological analyser designed for languages with rich morphology and complex word compounding and character encoding, originally designed for the Hungarian language.

Hunspell is based on MySpell and is backward-compatible with MySpell dictionaries. While MySpell uses a single-byte character encoding, Hunspell can use Unicode UTF-8-encoded dictionaries.

== Uses ==
Software with Hunspell support:

Name	Type	Group	Method	Notes
Chrome	Web browser	Google	?	
Chromium	Web browser	Google	?	
Empathy	Instant messaging	—	Dynamically-linked libenchant	Issue selecting dictionaries Enchant
Firefox	Web browser	Mozilla	?	—
Illustrator	Vector graphics	Adobe	Statically-linked libhunspell	—
InDesign	Desktop publishing	Adobe	Statically-linked libhunspell	Since CS5.5
gedit	Text editor	GNOME	Dynamically-linked libenchant via GtkSpell	—
GroupWise		—		Starting in version 2012
JetBrains IDEs	Integrated development environment	JetBrains	—	ReSharper & IDEs use Hunspell dictionaries
.NET		—		
Origyn Web Browser	Web browser	—	Dynamically-linked spellchecker.library	Since 3.12
Perl		—		
QuarkXPress	Desktop publishing	Quark Software Inc.	Statically-linked libhunspell	Since QuarkXPress 2017
Scribus	Desktop publishing	—	Dynamically-linked libenchant	Since 1.4.2
Name	Type	Group	Method	Notes

== License ==
Hunspell is free software, distributed under the terms of a GPL, LGPL and MPL tri-license.

== See also ==
- Hungarian spellcheckers
- GNU Aspell
- Enchant
- Ispell
- MySpell
- Pspell
- Virastyar
