= Write! =

Text editor for Windows, macOS and Linux

- Developer: HamsterCoders
- Initial release: August 14, 2014
- Written in: C++
- Operating system: Windows, macOS, Linux
- License: Proprietary software
- Website: writeapp.co

Write! is a text editor for Windows, macOS and Linux. It is targeted at people who write short form pieces and want focus on text, as opposed to toolbars and navigation. It also has rich-text functionality, productivity and collaboration tools, native Cloud and its own publishing platform.

It appears that Write! is now defunct. Following the link to the website you will be informed that the domain is suspended. If you own Write! you may continue to use it but you can no longer buy or download the software.

== File formats ==
The app supports inputs in the formats of .txt, .wtt, .rtf, and .mdown. It can export in .html, .pdf, .odt, .docx, .txt, and .mdown.
