= MySpell =

- Final release: 3.0
- Written in: C++
- Operating system: Cross-platform
- Type: Spell checker
- License: Open source
- Website: code.google.com/a/apache-extras.org/p/ooo-myspell/

MySpell is a free spell checker, written to explore how affix compression could be implemented.

It used to be included with the OpenOffice.org office suite and Mozilla client software, and was replaced with the more powerful Hunspell library between 2006 and 2008.

MySpell license is based on the 2-clause BSD license, but has an additional clause requiring to explicitly mark any modified versions.

== Background ==
MySpell was started by Kevin Hendricks in an attempt to integrate various open-source spelling checkers into the OpenOffice.org build. With a little prodding from Kevin Atkinson, the author of Pspell and Aspell, a new spelling checker (MySpell) was written in C++ that supported affix compression, based on Ispell.

== Locale (language) files ==
Every locale (language for a specific territory) can have files for spelling, hyphenation and a thesaurus. These files will be all found together in one folder. The spell checking is done using the .aff file for the locale together with the .dic file. The .dic file is a list of words along with a group of letters which refer to the affixes found in the .aff file. This saves space because instead of having to include all forms of a word, like jump (jumping, jumps, jumped), the .dic file will include the word once and the references to the affixes in the .aff file allow the construction of all the other forms.

It is not enough to copy the files for a locale into the folder. As there are multiple locales, automatic loading of all dictionaries would cause a considerable overhead. Hence, only those locales listed in dictionary.lst are accessible. Dictionary.lst can be edited with a simple text editor, but front ends provide a more user-friendly way of adding new locales.

== MySpell with other programs ==
MySpell also is or has been used by other programs:

- AbiWord
- Aegisub 2.0 can use a dictionary created for MySpell by adding AFF and DIC files to the Dictionary folder.
- STAR Transit NXT, a CAT suite from the Swiss firm STAR AG, can optionally use MySpell dictionaries for spell-checking.

Aspell and Vim 7 can now use a dictionary created for MySpell.

== See also ==
- GNU Aspell
- Hunspell
- Ispell
- Pspell
- Enchant
