= Enchant (software) =

- Original author(s): AbiWord developers / Dom Lachowicz
- Developer(s): Enchant developers / Reuben Thomas
- Stable release: 2.8.2 / 14 August 2024; 7 months ago
- Repository: github.com/rrthomas/enchant
- Written in: C, C++, and Vala (programming language)
- Operating system: Linux, BSDs, Mac OS X, Windows
- Size: ~1.3MB (source code only)
- Type: Spell checker
- License: Variant of LGPL
- Website: rrthomas.github.io/enchant

Enchant is a free software project developed as part of the AbiWord word processor with the aim of unifying access to the various existing spell-checker software. Enchant wraps a common set of functionality present in a variety of existing products/libraries, and exposes a stable API/ABI for doing so. Where a library doesn't implement some specific functionality, Enchant will emulate it.

Enchant is capable of having multiple backends loaded at once. As of January 2021 it has support for 7 backends:

- Hunspell (spell checker used by LibreOffice, Firefox and Google Chrome)
- Nuspell (modern spell checker compatible with Hunspell dictionaries)
- Aspell (intends to replace Ispell)
- Hspell (Hebrew)
- Voikko (Finnish)
- Zemberek (Turkish)
- AppleSpell (macOS)

GNOME LaTeX and gedit rely on the gspell library, which uses Enchant.

Enchant is currently licensed under GNU Lesser General Public License (LGPL), with an additional permission notice saying that any plugin backend can be loaded and used by Enchant. This ensures that it can use the native spell checkers on various platforms (Mac OS X, Microsoft Office, Amazon Kindle, etc.), and users can use their favorite third-party product to do the job.
