= Gedit =

Linux text editor

gedit

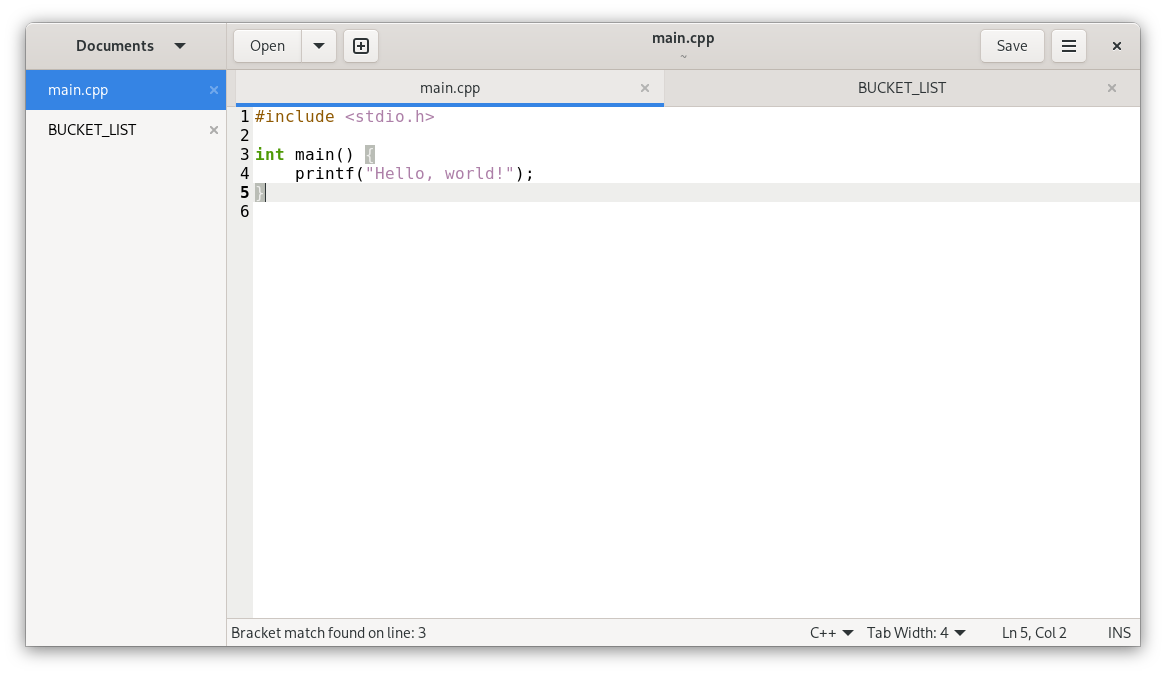
- gedit 46.1 showing "Hello, world!" with syntax highlighting and one other tab
- Developers: Paolo Maggi; Paolo Borelli; Steve Frécinaux; Jesse van den Kieboom; James Willcox; Chema Celorio; Federico Mena Quintero
- Release: February 12, 1999; 27 years ago
- Stable release: 49.0 / 16 January 2026; 7 months ago
- Preview release: 43.alpha / 6 July 2022; 4 years ago
- Written in: C, Python
- Operating system: Linux, MacOS, Windows
- Type: Text editor
- License: GPL-2.0-or-later
- Website: gedit-text-editor.org
- Repository: gitlab.gnome.org/World/gedit/gedit

gedit (/ˈdʒɛdɪt/ or /ˈɡɛdɪt/) is a text editor designed for the GNOME desktop environment. It was GNOME's default text editor and part of the GNOME Core Applications until GNOME version 42 in March 2022, which changed the default text editor to GNOME Text Editor. Designed as a general-purpose text editor, gedit emphasizes simplicity and ease of use, with a clean and simple GUI, according to the philosophy of the GNOME project. It includes tools for editing source code and structured text such as markup languages. It is free and open-source software under the GNU General Public License version 2 or later.

By July 2017, gedit was not being maintained by any developers, but in August 2017 two developers volunteered to commence work on it again.

== Features ==
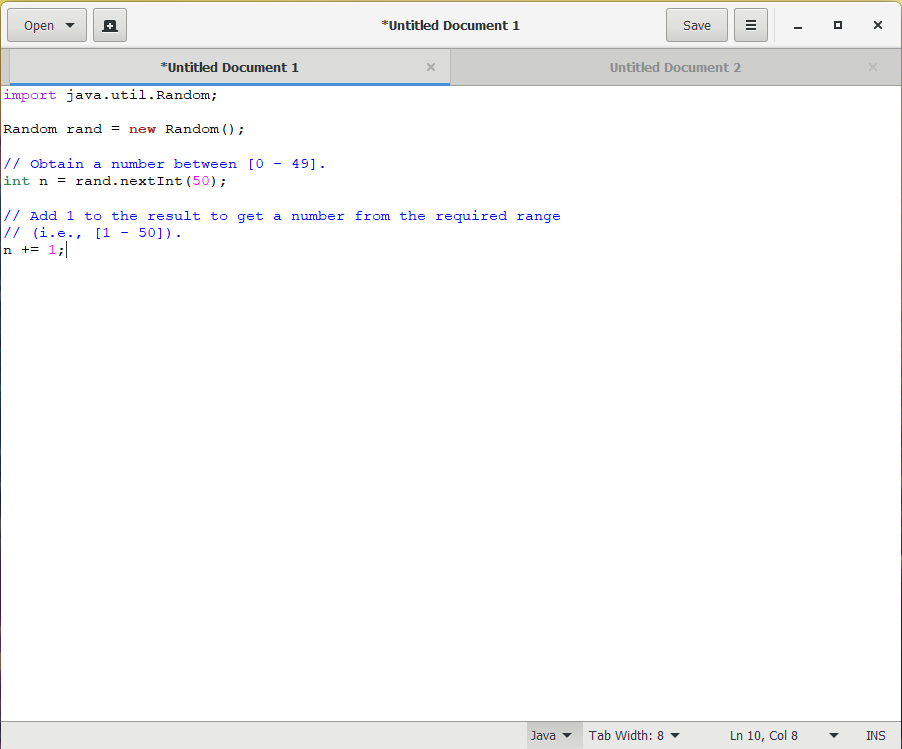
gedit is also available for Windows, seen here running on Windows 10.

gedit includes syntax highlighting via GtkSourceView for various program code and text markup formats including MediaWiki. gedit also has GUI tabs for editing multiple files. Tabs can be moved between various windows by the user. It can edit remote files using GVfs libraries; (GnomeVFS is now deprecated). It supports a full undo and redo system, search and replace as well as replace all. Other typical code oriented features include line numbering, bracket matching, text wrapping, current line highlighting, automatic indentation and automatic file backup.

The features of gedit include multi language spell checking via Enchant and a flexible plugin system allowing the addition of new features, for example snippets and integration with external applications including a Python or Bash terminal. A number of plugins are included in gedit itself, with more plugins in the gedit-plugins package and online.

Since version 3.20 gedit uses gspell for spell checking.

gedit has an optional side pane displaying the list of open files and (in a different tab of the side pane) a file browser. It also has an optional bottom pane with a Python console and (using gedit-plugins) terminal. gedit automatically detects when an open file is modified on disk by another application and offers to reload that file. Using a plugin (in gedit-plugins package), gedit can save and load sessions, which are lists of currently open tabs.

gedit supports printing, including print preview and printing to PostScript and PDF files. Printing options include text font, and page size, orientation, margins, optional printing of page headers and line numbers, as well as syntax highlighting.

In late 2013 and early 2014 the application received major upgrades for Gnome 3.12, with a new, cleaner user interface and code base improvements to make it work better with other desktop interfaces, such as Unity.

== Architecture ==
gedit logo from 2010

gedit logo from 2009

gedit logo from 2006

Being part of the GNOME Core Applications, gedit 3 uses the GTK 3.x and GNOME 3.x libraries. The GNOME integration includes drag and drop to and from GNOME Files.

gedit uses the GNOME help system for documentation. It also uses virtual file system and GNOME printing framework.

In December 2008, gedit binaries were made available for macOS and Windows.

The last version for Windows 32-bit was 2.30.1, released in 2014. Standalone releases for 64-bit Windows continued, with Version 3.20.1 released in 2016.

Current versions of gedit (3.0+) for Windows are also available through MSYS2 and can be installed via the built-in Pacman package manager.

== See also ==
- FeatherPad
- jEdit
- Pluma (text editor)
- List of text editors
- Comparison of text editors
