= MULE =

Computer software

The MULtilingual Enhancement (MULE) is computer software which adds extra written language characters to the GNU Emacs text editor and programming environment.

MULE provides facilities to handle text written in many languages (at least 42 character sets, 53 coding sets, 128 input methods, and 58 languages), and multilingual texts containing several languages in the same buffer. This goes beyond the simple facilities offered by Unicode to represent multilingual text. MULE also supports input methods, composing display using fonts in various encodings, changing character syntax and other editing facilities to correspond to local language usage, and more.

MULE was originally based on Nemacs, a version of Emacs extended to handle Japanese, released in 1987. Development stalled, and the effort to incorporate increased language functionality into the main Emacs version stalled, until the fork between Lucid Inc. and the Free Software Foundation (FSF) led to XEmacs, which for several years boasted considerably better support for multiple languages and character sets. This competition reinvigorated development of GNU Emacs's language handling abilities and prompted the inclusion of MULE in version 21 of GNU Emacs.

MULE was written by the researchers Satoru Tomura, Ken'ichi Handa, Mikiko Nishikimi, and Naoto Takahashi, of the National Institute of Advanced Industrial Science and Technology (AIST), which is a part of Ministry of Economy, Trade and Industry (METI), of the government of Japan. This made it impossible for the developers to assign copyright to FSF, as is usually done for contributions to GNU packages.
