= Right Thing =

Right Thing or The Right Thing may refer to:

== Entertainment ==
- "The Right Thing" (song), a 1987 single by Simply Red
- The Right Thing (film), a 1963 comedy Australian TV play
- "The Right Thing", a season 4 episode of the sitcom New Girl
- "The Right Thing", a 2011 song by Moby from the album Destroyed (Moby album)

== Other uses ==
- Ethics, the study of right and wrong conduct
- "The right thing", also called the "MIT approach", a perfectionistic approach to software development described by Richard P. Gabriel in the influential essay "Lisp: Good News, Bad News, How to Win Big"

== See also ==
- "The Right Thing to Do", a 1972 song by Carly Simon
