= Worse is better =

Theory of software design

"Worse is better" or the "New Jersey style" is a term coined by Richard P. Gabriel in a 1989 essay to describe the dynamics of software acceptance and the frequency with which "worse" designs seem to outcompete better ones. The essay argues simple, hacked-together software that makes it to market first will often outcompete better and more elegant designs. Gabriel argues that by the time the elegant design is complete, users who have adopted the worse design will be unable to switch as a result of switching barriers, vendor lock-in, and backward compatibility requirements. Gabriel contrasts "worse-is-better" software with the "MIT Approach" of doing the "Right Thing", and argues bare-minimum software "has better survival characteristics than the-right-thing".

Gabriel offers the examples of the adoption of C over Lisp, Unix over Lisp machines and VMS, and x86 over reduced instruction set computers as examples of technically worse solutions defeating more elegant ones by arriving to market first.

The essay was included into the 1994 book The UNIX-HATERS Handbook, and has been referred to as the origin of the notion of a conceptual split between developers on the east and west coasts of the United States.

== Origin ==
Gabriel was a Lisp programmer when he formulated the concept in 1989, presenting it in his essay "Lisp: Good News, Bad News, How to Win Big". A section of the article, titled "The Rise of 'Worse is Better'", was widely disseminated beginning in 1991, after Jamie Zawinski found it in Gabriel's files at Lucid Inc. and emailed it to friends and colleagues.

== Characteristics ==
In The Rise of Worse is Better, Gabriel identified a "Worse is Better" model of software design and implementation which has the characteristics of simplicity, correctness, consistency, and completeness (in approximately descending order of importance). Gabriel contrasted his philosophy, also called the "New Jersey style", "Berkeley", or "West coast" model, with what he called the "MIT/Stanford style of design" or "MIT approach", also known as the "east coast" approach or "the Right Thing".

Characteristic	New Jersey style	The MIT approach
Simplicity	The design must be simple, both in implementation and interface. It is more important for the implementation to be simple than the interface. Simplicity is the most important consideration in a design.	The design must be simple, both in implementation and interface. It is more important for the interface to be simple than the implementation.
Correctness	The design should be correct in all observable aspects. It is slightly better to be simple than correct.	The design must be correct in all observable aspects. Incorrectness is simply not allowed.
Consistency	The design must not be overly inconsistent. Consistency can be sacrificed for simplicity in some cases, but it is better to drop those parts of the design that deal with less common circumstances than to introduce either complexity or inconsistency in the implementation.	The design must be consistent. A design is allowed to be slightly less simple and less complete to avoid inconsistency. Consistency is as important as correctness.
Completeness	The design must cover as many important situations as is practical. All reasonably expected cases should be covered. Completeness can be sacrificed in favor of any other quality. In fact, completeness must be sacrificed whenever implementation simplicity is jeopardized. Consistency can be sacrificed to achieve completeness if simplicity is retained; especially worthless is consistency of interface.	The design must cover as many important situations as is practical. All reasonably expected cases must be covered. Simplicity is not allowed to overly reduce completeness.

Gabriel argued that early Unix and C, developed by Bell Labs (at their campus in New Jersey, thus lending the term its alternate name), are examples of the worse-is-better design approach. He also calls them "the ultimate computer viruses", due to their rapid spread.

== Effects ==
Gabriel argued that "Worse is better" produced more successful software than the MIT approach: As long as the initial program is "good enough", it will take much less time and effort to implement initially and it will be easier to adapt to new situations. Porting software to new machines, for example, becomes far easier this way. Thus its use will spread rapidly, long before a program developed using the MIT approach has a chance to be developed and deployed (first-mover advantage). Once it has spread, there will be pressure to improve its functionality, but users have already been conditioned to accept "worse" rather than the "right thing":

Therefore, the worse-is-better software first will gain acceptance, second will condition its users to expect less, and third will be improved to a point that is almost the right thing. In concrete terms, even though Lisp compilers in 1987 were about as good as C compilers, there are many more compiler experts who want to make C compilers better than want to make Lisp compilers better.

Gabriel credits Jamie Zawinski for excerpting the worse-is-better sections of "Lisp: Good News, Bad News, How to Win Big" and e-mailing them to his friends at Carnegie Mellon University, who sent them to their friends at Bell Labs, "who sent them to their friends everywhere". He apparently connected these ideas to those of Richard Stallman and saw related ideas that are important in the design philosophy of Unix, and more generally in the open-source movement, both of which were central to the development of Linux.

In December 2000 Gabriel answered his earlier essay with one titled Worse Is Better Is Worse under the pseudonym Nickieben Bourbaki (an allusion to Nicolas Bourbaki), while also writing Is Worse Really Better?, applying the concept to C++'s success in the field of object-oriented programming despite the existence of more elegant languages designed around the concept.

The UNIX-HATERS Handbook includes Worse is Better as an appendix, and frames the concept in terms of worse-is-better in the form of Unix being "evolutionarily superior" to its competition.

== See also ==
- Gresham's law
- If it ain't broke don't fix it
- Keep it simple stupid
- Less is more
- Minimum viable product
- Neats and scruffies
- Perfect is the enemy of good
- Satisficing
- Unix
- Wabi-sabi
