= Richard P. Gabriel =

American poet

- Born: October 31, 1949 (age 76); Merrimac, Massachusetts, United States
- Education: B.A., Northeastern University, 1972; Graduate studies, Massachusetts Institute of Technology, 1973; M.S., University of Illinois, 1975; Ph.D., Stanford University, 1981; M.F.A., Warren Wilson College, 1998
- Known for: Common Lisp; Worse is Better; Maclisp; League for Programming Freedom; Lucid Inc.; XEmacs
- Spouses: Kathy; Lynne; Jo
- Children: 2
- Awards: Association for Computing Machinery Fellows Award, 1998; ACM-AAAI Allen Newell Award, 2004
- Scientific career
- Fields: Computer science; Programming
- Workplaces: Stanford University; Lawrence Livermore National Laboratory; Lucid Inc.; ParcPlace-Digitalk; Sun Microsystems IBM
- Academic advisors: PhD: David Waltz; Terry Winograd
- Website: dreamsongs.com

Richard P. Gabriel (born 1949) is an American computer scientist known for his work in computing related to the programming language Lisp, and especially Common Lisp. His best known work was a 1990 essay "Lisp: Good News, Bad News, How to Win Big", which introduced the phrase Worse is Better, and his set of benchmarks for Lisp, termed Gabriel Benchmarks, published in 1985 as Performance and evaluation of Lisp systems. These became a standard way to benchmark Lisp implementations.

== Biography ==
He was born in 1949, in the town of Merrimac in northeastern Massachusetts to two dairy farmers. He studied at Northeastern University, Boston, where he earned a B.A. in mathematics (1967–1972). As of 2019, he resides in Redwood City, California with his wife, Jo. He has a son named Joseph, and a daughter named Mariko, a Doctor of Physical Therapy in Los Altos, California.

=== Studying ===
Subsequently, he pursued graduate studies in mathematics at MIT, from 1972 to 1973; he was tapped by Patrick Winston to become a permanent member of the artificial intelligence (AI) Lab at MIT, but funding difficulties made it impossible to retain him. Gabriel tried to start up, with Dave Waltz, an AI Lab at the University of Illinois at Urbana–Champaign, but after two years the lab fell through due to general apathy. During this time, from 1973 to 1975, Gabriel managed to earn an MS in mathematics.

Because of some of his mathematical work, Gabriel was then admitted to Stanford University; during that time (1975–1981), he served as a teaching assistant to John McCarthy, the founder of Lisp; he ported Maclisp from its native operating system, the Incompatible Timesharing System (ITS) to WAITS. He earned a PhD in computer science (on the topic of natural language generation); and he and his wife Kathy had a son. Around this time, he became a spokesperson for the League for Programming Freedom.

=== Postdoctoral work ===
After earning a PhD, he continued to work on AI projects for McCarthy, although his thesis advisor was Terry Winograd. He eventually began working for Lawrence Livermore National Laboratory, where he recruited several of the researchers and programmers for a company, Lucid, Incorporated, he founded in 1984 and would leave in 1992. It survived until 1994.

Gabriel was at various times the President and Chairman of Lucid Inc. The product the company shipped was a Lisp integrated development environment (IDE) for Sun Microsystems’ reduced instruction set computer (RISC) hardware architecture named SPARC. This sidestepped the main failure of Lisp machines by, in essence, rewriting the Lisp machine IDE for use on a more cost-effective and less moribund architecture. During this time, Gabriel married his second wife, and had a daughter; he later divorced his second wife in 1993.

Eventually Lucid's focus shifted (during the AI Winter) to an IDE for C++. A core component of the IDE was Richard Stallman’s version of Emacs, GNU Emacs. GNU Emacs was not up to Lucid’s needs, however, and several Lucid programmers were assigned to help develop GNU Emacs. Friction arose between the programmers and Stallman over how to handle graphical user interface (GUI) issues, and Lucid forked Emacs, and thus became mainly responsible for the birth of what would come to be called XEmacs. One of his hires was another notable programmer, Jamie W. Zawinski.

=== Own business and open-source software ===
After Gabriel left Lucid, Inc. for good, he became a Vice President of Development for ParcPlace Systems (1994–1995), and then a consultant, for, among others, Aspen Smallworks, before joining Sun Microsystems as a Distinguished Engineer. There, Gabriel was an influential contributor to the evolution of the open source software strategy, culminating in publication of the book Innovation Happens Elsewhere. In 2007, he joined IBM Research as a Distinguished Engineer.

=== Association for Computing Machinery ===
Gabriel has received the Association for Computing Machinery's (ACM) 1998 Fellows Award, and its 2004 ACM-AAAI Allen Newell Award. The citation reads: "For innovations in programming languages and software design, and promoting the interaction between computer science and other disciplines, notably architecture and poetry."

He was chairman of the Object-Oriented Programming, Systems, Languages & Applications (OOPSLA) conference in 2007.

=== Poetry ===
In 1998, he received his MFA in Poetry from Warren Wilson College. He has published poems in some literary journals. His chapbook, Drive On, was published by Hollyridge Press in 2005.

== Works ==
- Gabriel, Richard P. (May 1985). Performance and Evaluation of Lisp Systems (PDF). Cambridge, Mass: MIT Press; Computer Systems Series. ISBN 9780262070935. LCCN 85-15161.
- Gabriel, Richard P. (1996). Patterns of Software: Tales from the Software Community (PDF). Oxford University Press. ISBN 978-0-19-512123-0.
- Gabriel, Richard P. (2002). Writers' Workshops & the Work of Making Things: Patterns, Poetry... (PDF). Addison-Wesley. ISBN 978-0-201-72183-6.
- Gabriel, Richard P. (2005). Drive On. Hollyridge Press. ISBN 978-0-9752573-8-8.
