= The UNIX-HATERS Handbook =

1994 book by Simson Garfinkel

- Author: Simson Garfinkel, Daniel Weise, Steven Strassmann
- Publisher: IDG
- Publication date: 1994
- ISBN: 1-56884-203-1

The UNIX-HATERS Handbook is a semi-humorous edited compilation of messages to the UNIX-HATERS mailing list. The book was edited by Simson Garfinkel, Daniel Weise and Steven Strassmann and published in 1994.

== Contents ==
The book concerns the frustrations of users of the Unix operating system. Many users had come from systems that they felt were far more sophisticated in features and usability, and they were frustrated by the perceived "worse is better" design philosophy that they felt Unix and much of its software encapsulated.

The book is based on messages sent to the UNIX-HATERS mailing list between 1988 and 1993, and contains a foreword by the human factors guru Don Norman and an "anti-foreword" by Dennis Ritchie, one of the creators of the operating system.

Many of the book's complaints about the Unix operating system are based on design decisions and anomalies in the command-line interface.

The front-matter page's dedication says: "To Ken and Dennis, without whom this book would not have been possible.", referring to Ken Thompson and Dennis Ritchie, the creators of Unix.

== Release ==
This book was printed as a trade paperback. Its front cover was designed to be similar to The Scream. An air sickness bag, printed with the phrase "UNIX barf bag", was inserted into the inside back cover of every copy by the publisher.

The book was made available to download for free in electronic format in 2003.

== Reception ==
Later reviewers of the book have noted that some issues have been resolved; for example, file systems that use larger block sizes or extents, such as the ext2 filesystem, were developed for Unix-like systems.
