= Barrington Chalk Pit =

Site of Special Scientific Interest near Barrington in Cambridgeshire

Coordinates: 52.142°N 0.033°E

- Site of Special Scientific Interest
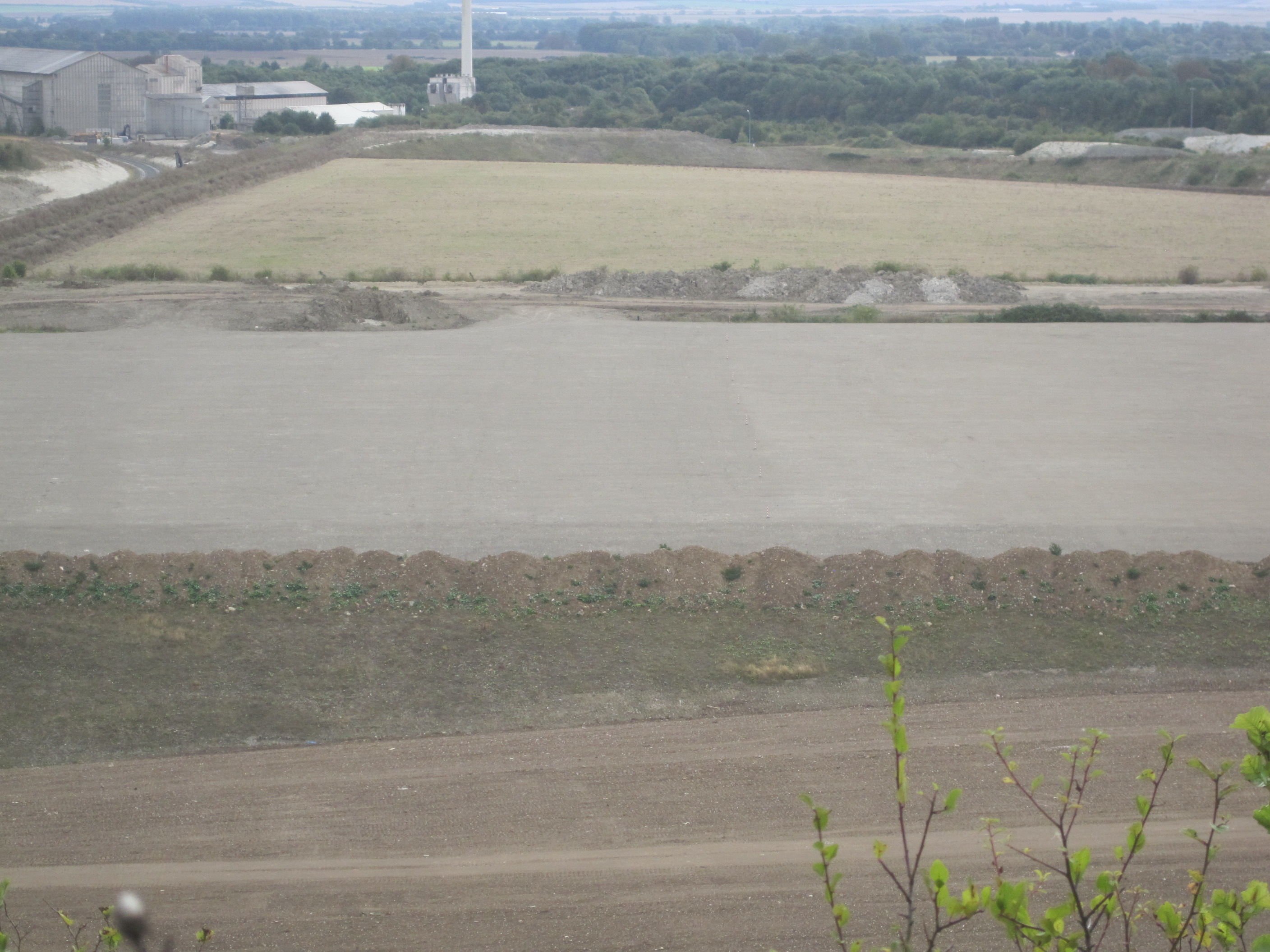
- Location of Barrington Chalk Pit.
- Area of search: Cambridgeshire
- Grid reference: TL 392 512
- Interest: Geological
- Area: 97.1 hectares
- Notification date: 1997
- Location map: Magic Map

Barrington Chalk Pit is a 97.1-hectare (240-acre) geological Site of Special Scientific Interest near Barrington in Cambridgeshire. It is a Geological Conservation Review site.

This large quarry is the only surviving exposure of the Cretaceous Cambridge Greensand. Fossils include brachiopods and fish teeth. It is overlain by thick sequences of chalk and Totternhoe Stone.

Large parts of the site are a working quarry which is closed to the public, while other areas have been filled in and are now fields which are crossed by footpaths.

== History ==
The works were acquired by Cemex in 2005. Most quarrying ceased in 2008, however, limited quarrying continued for a further few years. In 2012, Cemex confirmed that the plant would be fully closed and demolished. The site has continued to be used as a landfill, with waste building materials arriving by train. Since 2021, the site has been used for disposal of spoil transported by rail from High Speed 2 construction sites.
