= Barrington Pit =

Protected area in Cambridgeshire, England

Coordinates: 52.123°N 0.019°E

- Site of Special Scientific Interest
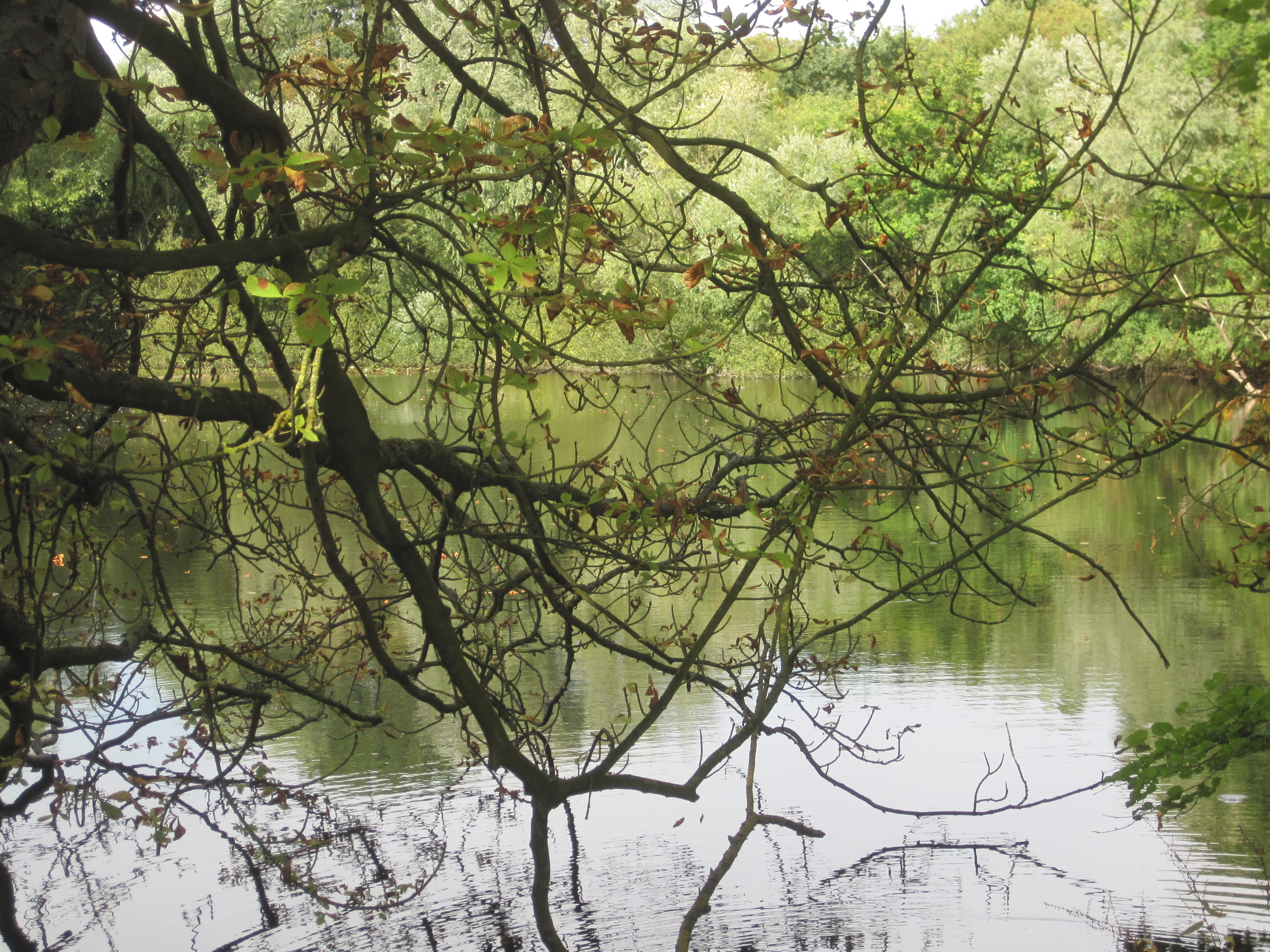
- Location of Barrington Pit.
- Area of search: Cambridgeshire
- Grid reference: TL 383 491
- Interest: Geological
- Area: 3.8 hectares
- Notification date: 1989
- Location map: Magic Map

Barrington Pit is a 3.8-hectare (9.4-acre) geological Site of Special Scientific Interest near Barrington in Cambridgeshire. It is a Geological Conservation Review site.

This site is described by Natural England as of national importance for its mammal fossils, most of which were found around 1900. Species include hippopotamuses, straight-tusked elephants, lions, aurochs and spotted hyenas. They probably date to the warm Eemian period, around 130,000 to 115,000 years ago.

The site is private land, part of which is now covered by housing.
