= Lucid Inc. =

Defunct American software company

- Industry: Software industry
- Founded: 1984; 42 years ago
- Defunct: 1994; 32 years ago
- Fate: Bankruptcy (1994)
- Headquarters: Menlo Park, California
- Key people: Richard P. Gabriel, Scott Fahlman, Rodney Brooks
- Products: Lucid Common Lisp, Energize, Lucid Emacs

Lucid Incorporated was a Menlo Park, California-based computer software development company. Founded by Richard P. Gabriel in 1984, it went bankrupt in 1994.

== History ==
The first CEO was Tony Slocum, formerly of IntelliCorp; and Gabriel was Lucid's Chief Technical Officer (CTO) and first president.

=== Initial success ===
The product the company ultimately shipped was an integrated Lisp IDE for Sun Microsystems' RISC hardware architecture—this sidestepped the principal failure of Lisp machines by in essence rewriting a lesser version of the Lisp machine IDE for use on a more cost-effective and less moribund architecture. In 1987, Gabriel resigned as President, but remained its CTO.

=== Decline ===
Eventually Lucid's focus shifted (during the AI Winter) from the Lisp market (which was still growing at this time) to an object-oriented IDE for C++ called "Energize". A core component of the IDE was Richard Stallman's version of Emacs, GNU Emacs. GNU Emacs was not suitable for Lucid's needs, however, and several Lucid programmers (including Jamie W. Zawinski) were assigned to help develop GNU Emacs to meet those needs. Friction arose between the programmers and Stallman, and Lucid forked the software—thus they were primarily responsible for the birth of XEmacs.

By 1994, Lucid's attempts to reinvent itself as a C++ company, and its neglect of its still profitable Lisp sideline had ended in failure, and the company's revenues fell to levels which could not sustain it. Lucid Incorporated went bankrupt. The rights to Lucid Common Lisp were sold to Harlequin Ltd. which was bought in 1999 by Global Graphics; Global Graphics then sold the rights to Xanalys Corporation, which spun off LispWorks, the current rights holder which sells Lucid Common Lisp under the "Liquid Common Lisp" label.
