= Barrington, Cambridgeshire =

Village in Cambridgeshire, England

Coordinates: 52.13°N 0.03°E

Barrington
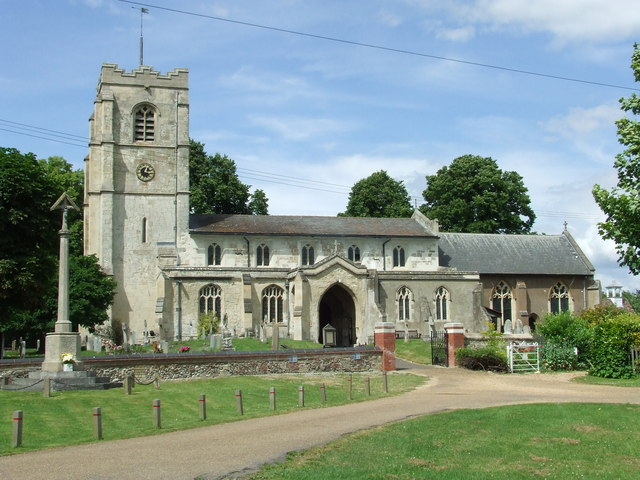
- All Saints' Church

- Location within Cambridgeshire
- Population: 993 (2011 Census)
- OS grid reference: TL391503
- District: South Cambridgeshire
- Shire county: Cambridgeshire
- Region: East
- Country: England
- Sovereign state: United Kingdom
- Post town: CAMBRIDGE
- Postcode district: CB22
- Dialling code: 01223

Barrington is a small village and civil parish in the South Cambridgeshire district of Cambridgeshire, England. The village is about 7 miles (11 km) south-west of Cambridge, between Haslingfield and Shepreth.

== History ==
The parish of Barrington is roughly a trapezium in shape and covers 2282 acres. The southern boundary follows the River Cam which separates it from the parishes of Shepreth, Foxton, and Harston and formed the ancient boundary of Wetherley hundred. Its northern boundary reaches the ancient Mare Way at its north-westernmost tip, a track that ran along the ridge of the White Hill, and now forms the A603. It borders Orwell to the west, Harlton to the north and Haslingfield to the east.

Listed as Barentone in the Domesday Book of 1086 the name "Barrington" is believed to mean "farmstead of a man called Bara".

The village has long been an important manufacturer of bricks and cement; there were already four brick-makers by the 1840s. The Prime family opened the Shepreth road brickworks by 1876 which changed hands several times over the 20th century as it grew in size. At the northern end of the village was the Cemex cement works which closed in 2008.

Barrington Hall was once the seat of the Bendyshe family; it was used for a while as offices (see Harlequin) but currently for hosting weddings and other events.

== Church ==
The parish church of All Saints is a Grade I listed building. It has a chancel, an aisled and clerestoried nave with north and south porches and side chapels, and a west tower. The chancel and nave date from the 13th century and perhaps incorporate parts of an older building at its western end. The tower was added later in the 13th century, though only reached its current height in the 16th century, and the chancel was extended in the 14th century. The tower contains six bells.

== Village life ==
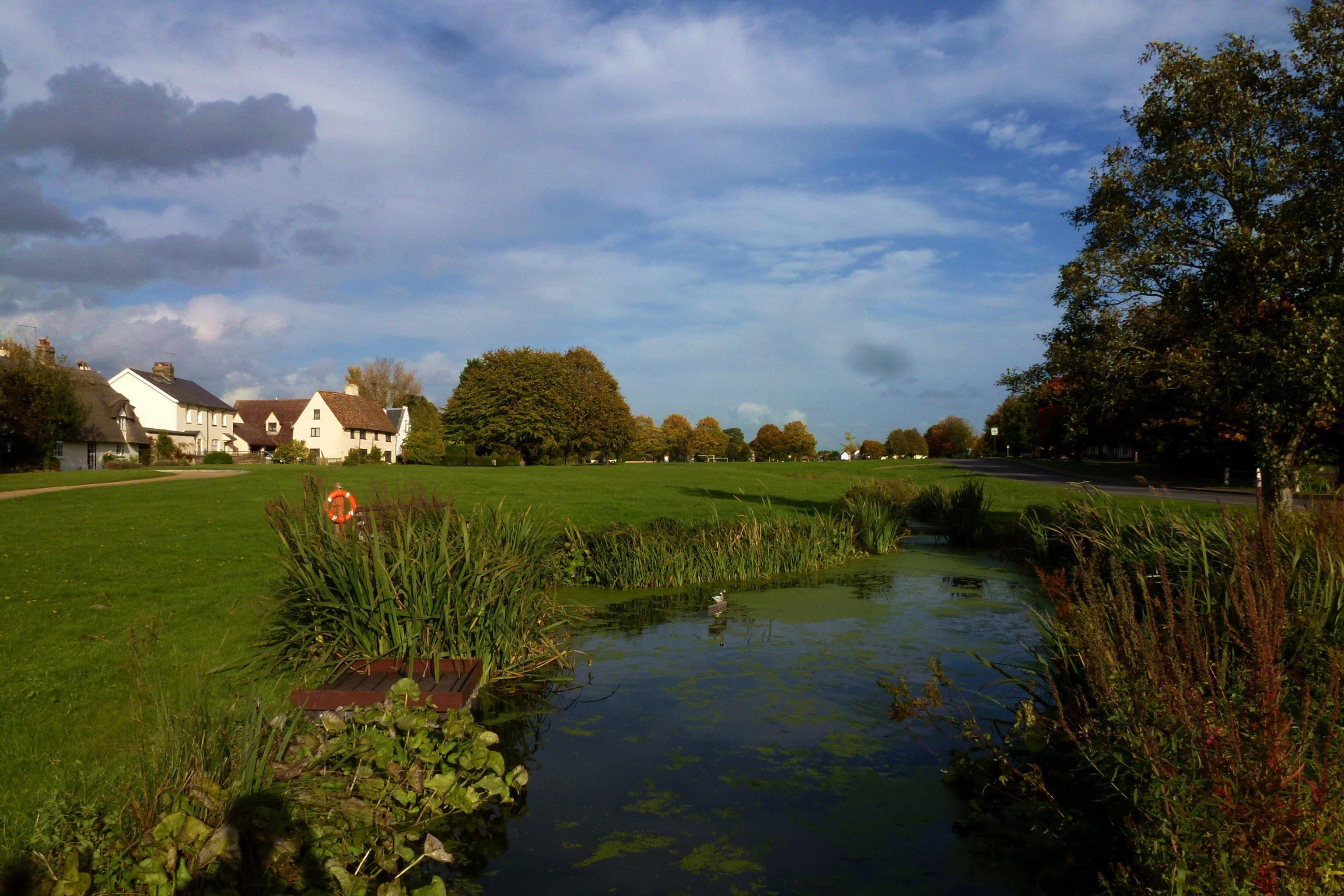
Pond and village green

The village retains one public house, The Royal Oak, which is housed in a building that dates back to the 13th century. Former pubs in the village include The Boot, and The Catherine Wheel, both open by 1850, The Victoria and The Fountain both open by 1900, and The Butcher's Arms by 1937. All were closed before the end of the 1960s.

The Barrington cement plant employed around 80 people and produced a million tonnes of concrete annually. After 90 years of production, it closed in 2008 and its 185-foot (56 m) chimney was demolished in 2018.

== Notable residents ==
- Edmund Leach, social anthropologist
- Elsie Widdowson, dietitian

== See also ==
- Barrington Chalk Pit
- Barrington Pit
