= Shepreth =

Village in Cambridgeshire, England

Coordinates: 52.1122°N 0.0325°E

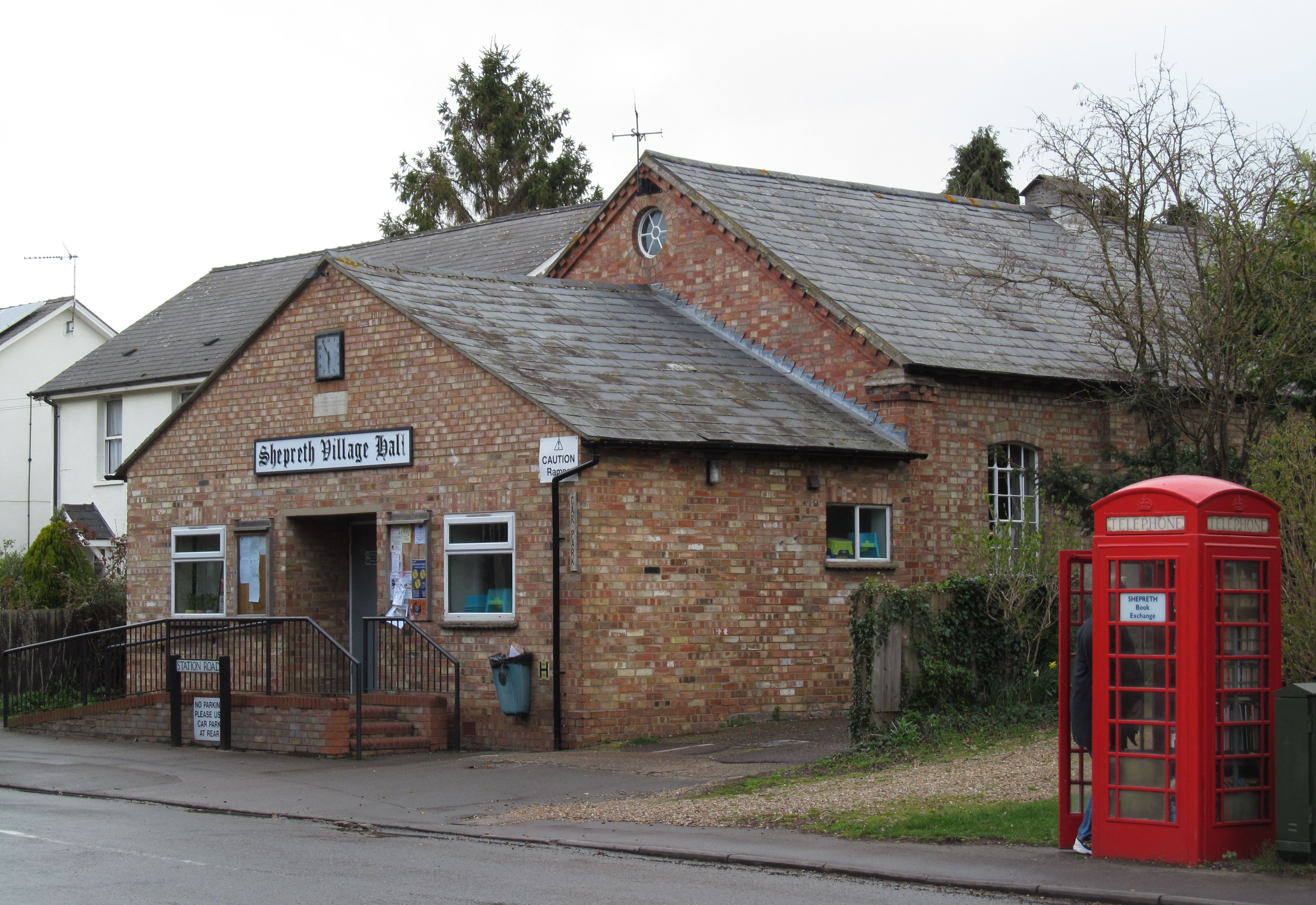
- Shepreth Village Hall and Shepreth Book Exchange, converted from a red telephone box

- Location within Cambridgeshire
- Population: 819 (2001); 768 (2011
- OS grid reference: TL3947
- District: South Cambridgeshire
- Shire county: Cambridgeshire
- Region: East
- Country: England
- Sovereign state: United Kingdom
- Post town: ROYSTON
- Postcode district: SG8
- Dialling code: 01763
- Police: Cambridgeshire
- Fire: Cambridgeshire
- Ambulance: East of England

Shepreth is a small village and civil parish lying halfway between Cambridge and Royston in South Cambridgeshire, England.

== History ==
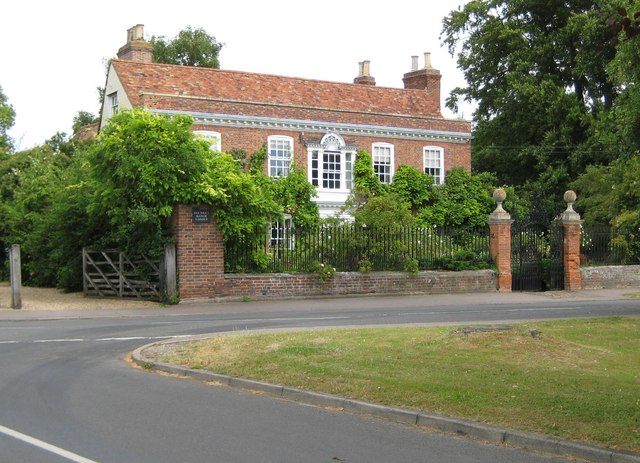
Docwra's Manor House

The parish of Shepreth is roughly rectangular and covers 1318 acres. It is bounded by the River Rhee to the north, which separates it from Barrington, Foxton brook to the east, across which lies Foxton, and Guilden Brook brook to the west, separating it from Meldreth and Melbourn. The field boundaries to the south border the parish of Fowlmere.

Stone Age weapons and tools have been found in the parish, and the land, formerly marshy, could thus have housed a lakeside settlement. Evidence of Roman habitation has been found on the drier ground in the northeast corner of the parish. Two medieval moated sites in the village are scheduled as ancient monuments.

Listed as Esceprid in the Domesday Book the name "Shepreth" means "sheep stream", and was used as a resting place where sheep could be washed on their route to Cambridge. The Sheep Bridge was still in use in 1626.

Prior to the dissolution of the monasteries, Shepreth was held by the Abbey of Chatteris. The manor of Shepreth then passed to Sir William Laxton and his heirs. The manors of Docwras and Wimbish were held by Geoffrey de Mandeville, then by the Hospital of St. John of Jerusalem and, after the dissolution, by William de la Haye and his heirs.

== Church ==
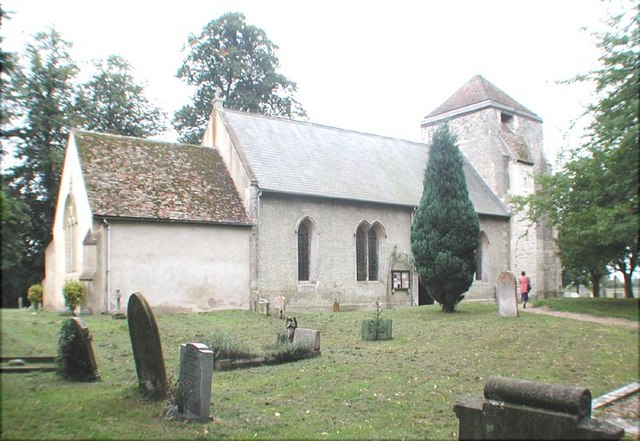
Church of All Saints

The parish church of All Saints is an ancient edifice of brick and flint in the Early English style, consisting of nave and a low western tower containing two bells. The chancel arch dates from the early 12th century. There are some monuments to the Layer family, who formerly possessed property here, dated 1730, 1743 and 1760. There is also a 13th-century octagonal font of Barnack stone, and an old oak treasure chest which was unearthed about 1895. The grade II* listed building was restored in 1870, and seats 120. The register dates from 1569.

There is a Congregational chapel, erected in 1901 and seating 120. A stone cross was erected on Pretty Corner in 1920, in memory of the men from the parish killed in World War I.

== Village life ==
The village has had its own railway station since 1851. In 1849, the Royston and Hitchin Railway Company paid £125 into village funds for constructing the railway over Shepreth L-Moor. Shepreth railway station is on the Great Northern Line, the main line between Cambridge and London. In 1928 there was a doubly fatal accident at the level-crossing near the East Anglian Cement Works.

The parish contains a wildlife park, a nature reserve, the Shepreth L-Moor common, and the UK's only insect research laboratories.

Shepreth has two public houses, The Green Man at Frog End on the Cambridge to Royston road, and The Plough on the High Street. In the 18th century The Green Man was known as the Bottle and Anchor. The pub that is now known as The Plough burnt down and was rebuilt in 1896. The Railway Tavern by the station opened in 1873 and closed around 1960.
