= L-Moor, Shepreth =

Protected area in Cambridgeshire, England

Coordinates: 52.108°N 0.022°E

- Site of Special Scientific Interest
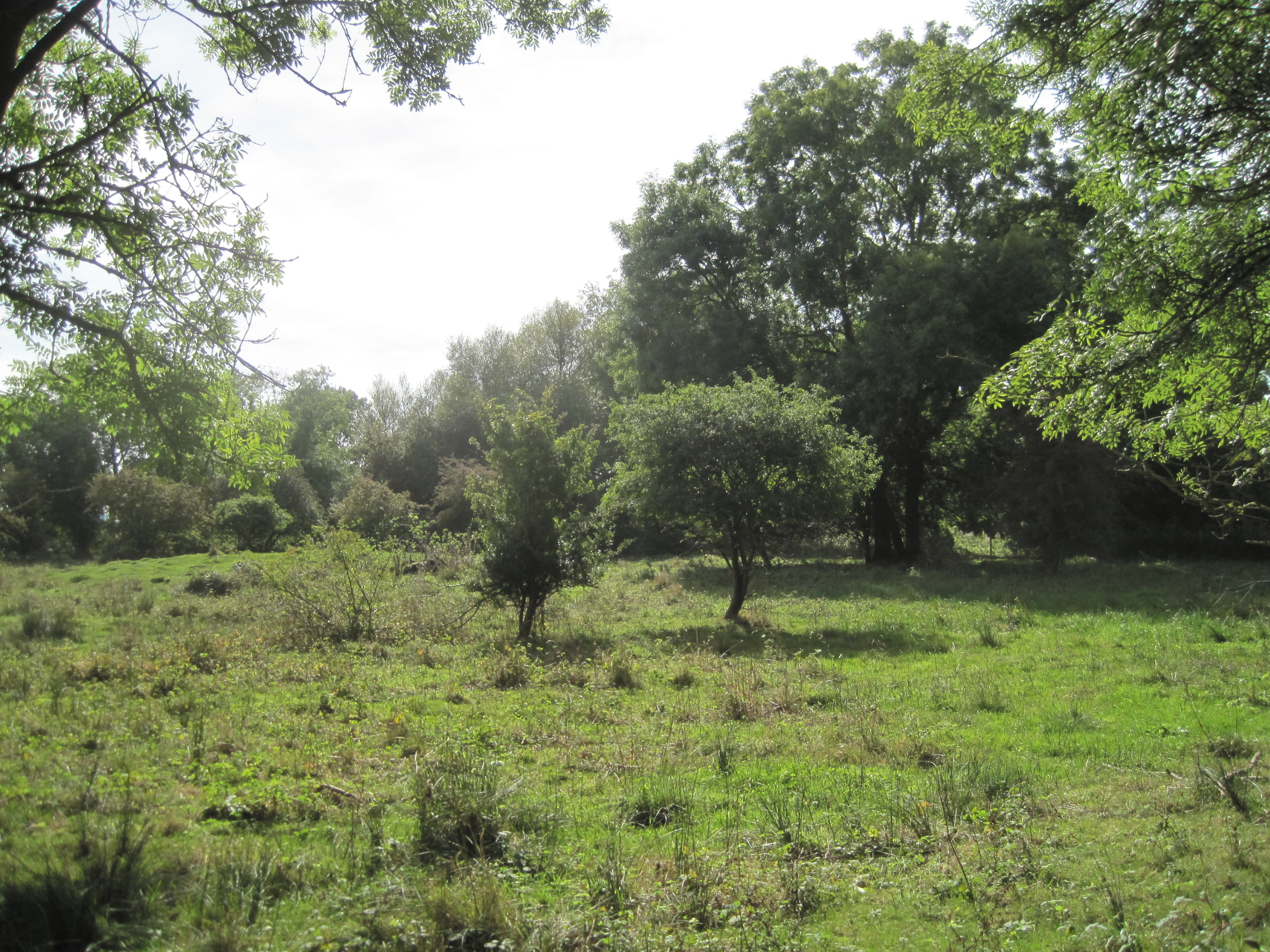
- Location of L-Moor, Shepreth.
- Area of search: Cambridgeshire
- Grid reference: TL 386 474
- Interest: Biological
- Area: 6.6 hectares
- Notification date: 1986
- Location map: Magic Map

L-Moor, Shepreth is a 6.6-hectare (16-acre) biological Site of Special Scientific Interest in Shepreth in Cambridgeshire. It is managed by the Wildlife Trust for Bedfordshire, Cambridgeshire and Northamptonshire.

The site is unploughed calcareous grassland which has diverse flora such as horseshoe vetch and felwort in drier areas, and devil's bit scabious and fen bedstraw in wetter ones. A stream provides a habitats, and the site is regarded by Natural England as very valuable for its invertebrates. Some areas are grazed by rabbits.

There is access from Meldreth Road.
