= Xanalys =

Xanalys Limited
- Type: Private
- Industry: Software
- Founded: Manchester (2009)
- Headquarters: Manchester, UK
- Website: Xanalys

Xanalys Limited is an independent software company founded in January 2009 when the Analytics and Investigative Management division of Tiburon Inc. was acquired by a group of former Xanalys management and engineering staff based in the UK. Various intellectual property and contracts relating to investigation and analysis software tools were acquired.

Xanalys now markets, develops and supports a range of software tools including PowerCase, Link Explorer and PowerIndexer.

== History ==
The original versions of the software tools were developed by the UK software company Harlequin. However, at that time Link Explorer was known as Watson, whilst Indexer has been known as PowerIndexer, Quenza and Hievat.

In 1999, Harlequin was acquired by Global Graphics primarily for its PostScript technologies. Global Graphics then spun off the LispWorks and HIntS (Harlequin Intelligence Systems) aspects of the business into the first Xanalys Limited in January 2000.

Xanalys was then acquired by Compudyne Corporation and operated, as part of Tiburon Inc. until January 2009.
