= Harlequin (software company) =

Software company

- The Harlequin lifting tile logo
- Trade name: Harlequin
- Company type: Private
- Industry: Application software; Programming languages; Think tank
- Predecessor: None
- Founded: 1987; 38 years ago in Cambridge, East of England, England
- Founder: Jo Marks
- Defunct: 1999
- Fate: Acquired by Global Graphics
- Successors: Functional Objects; Global Graphics; The Gwydion Maintainers; LispWorks; Xanalys
- Headquarters: Barrington, Cambridgeshire, United Kingdom
- Number of locations: 8 (1998)
- Areas served: Western Europe; North America; Australia
- Key people: Jo Marks
- Owner: Jo Marks
- Number of employees: 300 (1998)

Harlequin was a technology company based in Cambridge, UK and Cambridge, Massachusetts. It specialized in application software for printing, graphics, law enforcement, artificial intelligence, and in implementations of programming languages. Harlequin employees sometimes referred to themselves as "The 'Late Binding' company" and the firm eventually evolved into a think tank for advanced technologies.

After Global Graphics purchased Harlequin, they spun off the application groups for Lisp, artificial intelligence (AI), and law enforcement as Xanalys, and they spun off the Harlequin Dylan team as Functional Objects. Global Graphics acquired Harlequin mainly for the PostScript technologies, and it still continues to develop and market them under the Harlequin name.

== Think tank products ==
Harlequin had two main lines of business:

- Digital prepress (mainly ScriptWorks, a PostScript language compatible raster image processor (RIP), now selling under the name Harlequin RIP)
- Modern language development environments: compilers and integrated development environments (IDEs) for Lisp (LispWorks), ML (MLWorks), and Dylan (DylanWorks)

Other products included data analysis tools created using LispWorks, the Lisp IDE.

The think tank structure of Harlequin can also be recognized via the development of a flexible and modular memory management system, the Memory Pool System (MPS). MPS was designed to support:

- A wide range of requirements from high-speed manual memory management, to complex garbage collection with many different types of reference
- Two products: ScriptWorks PostScript RIP, and the Harlequin Dylan compiler and IDE for the Dylan language

== Think tank spin-offs ==
In January 2005 employees founded the independently owned LispWorks Limited to focus on the Lisp business.

Several of Harlequin's other assets and technologies have also been acquired and open sourced by companies founded by former Harlequin employees.

- Functional Objects Inc., was founded in 1999 to continue developing and producing the Dylan IDE. In 2004, all code was open sourced to The Gwydion Maintainers. They renamed the IDE to Open Dylan.
- Ravenbrook Limited acquired the Memory Management Reference, a public resource on memory management and garbage collection, the Memory Pool System, a flexible memory manager and garbage collector (now open sourced), and MLWorks, a Standard ML compiler and integrated development environment (also open sourced).

== History ==
Harlequin Limited was founded in 1987 by Jo Marks in Cambridge, England, and the first offices were located in the founder's home in Cambridge. The firm later moved to an office on Station Road, Cambridge, then in 1989 relocated to Barrington Hall, in the village of Barrington, Cambridgeshire, near Cambridge, which became the permanent company headquarters.

Expansion followed, and Harlequin Limited became The Harlequin Group Limited, with wholly owned subsidiaries in the United Kingdom (UK) (Harlequin Limited), the United States (Harlequin, Inc. - office opened in Cambridge, Massachusetts in 1993) and Australia (Harlequin Australia Pty Limited). The firm acquired in February 1995 the rights to the Lisp-related technology Lucid Common Lisp of Lucid Inc., that went out of business in summer 1994 due to financial hardships. Many of the newly hired American Lisp staff had formerly worked for two other Lisp companies which had failed previously: Lucid Inc. and Symbolics. In 1997, the group company became Harlequin Group plc.

At its peak in 1997–1998 the firm had over 300 staff, with offices in: Cambridge, England (including Barrington Hall and Longstanton); Edinburgh; Manchester; Cambridge, Massachusetts; Menlo Park, California, and several other places.

Due to failed expansion plans, the firm was declared bankrupt in summer 1999 and went into administration. It was acquired by Global Graphics, primarily for the PostScript technologies, which Global Graphics continues to develop and market under the Harlequin name (in 2006). Global Graphics created a subsidiary Xanalys for the data analysis and LispWorks businesses. In November 2006, Global moved from Barrington Hall to Cambourne Business Park.

In September 2005, CompuDyne Corporation acquired Xanalys, which operated for several years as part of Tiburon, Inc., the Public Safety and Justice division of CompuDyne. In January 2009 Xanalys was acquired by the UK staff based in Manchester and Cambridge. The firm continues to sell investigation and analysis tools developed by Harlequin originally (such as Link Explorer and Powercase) to a worldwide market.
