= Scott Fahlman =

American computer scientist (born 1948)

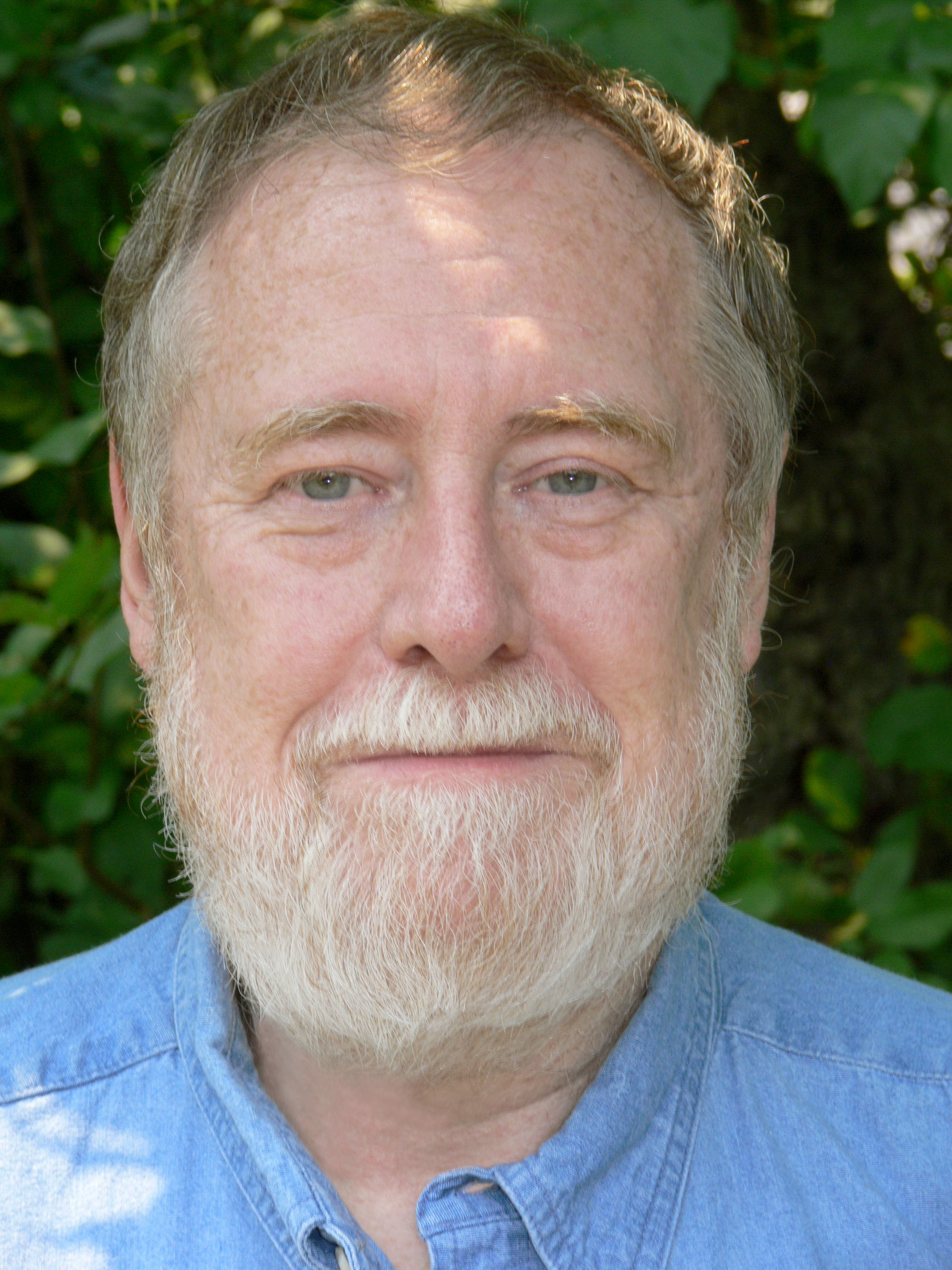
- Fahlman in 2007
- Born: Scott Elliott Fahlman; March 21, 1948 (age 78); Medina, Ohio, U.S.
- Education: Massachusetts Institute of Technology; B.S., M.S. (1973); Ph.D. (1977)
- Known for: Automated planning and scheduling: blocks world Semantic networks Neural networks Dylan; Common Lisp: CMU Common Lisp; Lucid Inc.
- Awards: Fellow, American Association for Artificial Intelligence
- Scientific career
- Fields: Computer science Natural language processing
- Workplaces: Carnegie Mellon University
- Thesis: NETL: A System for Representing and Using Real-World Knowledge (1977)
- Doctoral advisor: Gerald Jay Sussman
- Other academic advisors: Patrick Winston
- Doctoral students: David S. Touretzky; Michael Witbrock
- Website: www.cs.cmu.edu/~sef/

Scott Elliott Fahlman (born March 21, 1948) is an American computer scientist and Professor Emeritus at Carnegie Mellon University's Language Technologies Institute and Computer Science Department. He is notable for early work on automated planning and scheduling in a blocks world, on semantic networks, on neural networks (especially the cascade correlation algorithm), on the programming languages Dylan, and Common Lisp (especially CMU Common Lisp), and he was one of the founders of Lucid Inc. During the period when it was standardized, he was recognized as "the leader of Common Lisp." From 2006 to 2015, Fahlman was engaged in developing a knowledge base named Scone, based in part on his thesis work on the NETL Semantic Network. He also is credited with coining the use of the emoticon.

== Life and career ==
Fahlman was born in Medina, Ohio, the son of Lorna May (Dean) and John Emil Fahlman. He attended the Massachusetts Institute of Technology (MIT), where he received a Bachelor of Science (B.S.) and Master of Science (M.S.) degree in electrical engineering and computer science in 1973, and a Doctor of Philosophy (Ph.D.) in artificial intelligence in 1977. He has noted that his doctoral diploma says the degree was awarded for "original research as demonstrated by a thesis in the field of Artificial Intelligence" and suggested that it may be the first doctorate to use that term. He is a fellow of the American Association for Artificial Intelligence.

Fahlman acted as thesis advisor for Donald Cohen, David B. McDonald, David S. Touretzky, Skef Wholey, Justin Boyan, Michael Witbrock, and Alicia Tribble Sagae.

From May 1996 to July 2001, Fahlman directed the Justsystem Pittsburgh Research Center.

=== Boltzmann Machine (1983) ===
In 1983, Fahlman, Geoffrey Hinton, and Terry Sejnowski published a paper in Proceedings of the AAAI-83 Conference, Washington DC, August 1983. The paper was titled as "Massively Parallel Architectures for AI: NETL, Thistle and Boltzmann Machines".

=== Emoticons ===
Fahlman was not the first to suggest the concept of the emoticon – a similar concept for a marker appeared in an article of Reader's Digest in May 1967, although that idea was never put into practice.

In an interview printed in The New York Times in 1969, Vladimir Nabokov noted:

"I often think there should exist a special typographical sign for a smile – some sort of concave mark, a supine round bracket."

Fahlman is credited with originating the first smiley emoticon, which he thought would help people on a message board at Carnegie Mellon to distinguish serious posts from jokes. He proposed the use of :-) and :-( for this purpose, and the symbols caught on. The original message from which these symbols originated was posted on 19 September 1982. The message was recovered by Jeff Baird on 10 September 2002 and read:

19-Sep-82 11:44    Scott E  Fahlman             :-)
From: Scott E  Fahlman <Fahlman at Cmu-20c>

I propose that the following character sequence for joke markers:

:-)

Read it sideways.  Actually, it is probably more economical to mark
things that are NOT jokes, given current trends.  For this, use

:-(
