= LispWorks =

Software

- Paradigms: Multi-paradigm: procedural, functional, object-oriented, meta, reflective, generic
- Family: Lisp
- Developers: Harlequin Ltd. (1987–2000); Xanalys Ltd. (2001–2005); LispWorks Ltd. (2005–)
- First appeared: 1989; 36 years ago
- Stable release: 8.1.2 / December 15, 2025; 14 days ago
- Typing discipline: Dynamic, strong
- Scope: Lexical, optional dynamic
- Implementation language: Common Lisp
- Platform: IA-32, x86-64, ARM, SPARC, PowerPC
- OS: Windows, macOS, Linux, FreeBSD, Solaris, AIX, Android, iOS
- License: Proprietary
- Website: lispworks.com

Influenced by
- Lisp, Common Lisp

LispWorks is computer software, a proprietary implementation and integrated development environment (IDE) for the programming language Common Lisp. LispWorks was developed by the UK software company Harlequin Ltd., and first published in 1989. Harlequin ultimately spun off its Lisp division as Xanalys Ltd., which took over management and rights to LispWorks. In January 2005, the Xanalys Lisp team formed LispWorks Ltd. to market, develop, and support the software.

LispWorks's features include:

- A native-code compiler and an interpreter for an extended ANSI Common Lisp
- An implementation of the Common Lisp Object System with support for the metaobject protocol
- Support for 32-bit and 64-bit versions
- Native threads and symmetric multiprocessing
- Unicode support: it can read and write files, and supports strings, so encoded
- Foreign language interface (FFI) to interface with routines written in C
- A Java interface
- The common application programming interface (CAPI) graphical user interface (GUI) toolkit, which provides native look-and-feel on Windows, Cocoa, GTK+, and Motif
- An Emacs-like editor; source code is included in the Professional edition
- A Lisp Listener, which provides a Common Lisp read–eval–print loop (REPL)
- A graphical debugger, inspector, stepper, profiler, class browser, etc.
- A facility to generate standalone executables and shared libraries; to reduce memory size, a tree shaker can be used to remove unused code and data
- On macOS, it provides a bridge to Objective-C for using Apple's Cocoa libraries
- Many of the libraries are written using the Common Lisp Object System (CLOS) and can be extended by the user, by writing subclasses and new methods

The Enterprise edition also includes KnowledgeWorks, which supports rule-based or logic programming (including support for Prolog); the CommonSQL database interface; and a Common Object Request Broker Architecture (CORBA) binding.

In September 2009, it was announced that LispWorks 6 would support concurrent threads and the CAPI graphics toolkit had been extended to support GTK+. LispWorks 6.1, released in January 2012, included many further enhancements to CAPI, such as support for anti-aliased drawing.

LispWorks ran on the spacecraft Deep Space 1. The application called RAX won the NASA Software of the Year award in 1999.

== Releases ==
Date	Version	Company	Notes
1987	alpha	Harlequin	Begun by British firm
12 Sep 1989	1.0	Harlequin	GUI with CLX, CLUE, and LispWorks toolkit
Dec 1991	3.0	Harlequin	
17 Mar 1997	4.0	Harlequin	For Windows, GUI with CAPI, CLIM 2.0
06 Jan 1999	4.1	Harlequin	With CORBA, Linux port
19 Feb 2001	4.1.20	Xanalys	
19 Dec 2001	4.2	Xanalys	No run time fees for applications on Windows
05 May 2002	4.2.6	Xanalys	
30 Jun 2003	4.3	Xanalys	First release for macOS, with Cocoa support
08 Dec 2004	4.4	Xanalys	
15 Apr 2005	4.4.5	LispWorks	
31 Jul 2006	5.0	LispWorks	64-bit support, FreeBSD port
27 Mar 2008	5.1	LispWorks	
06 Jan 2010	6.0	LispWorks	With symmetric multiprocessing, Solaris on Intel port, CAPI for GTK+
27 Jan 2012	6.1	LispWorks	High-quality drawing, 64-bit FreeBSD port
05 May 2015	7.0	LispWorks	ARM Linux, iOS, Android, full Unicode, Hobbyist Edition
13 Nov 2017	7.1	LispWorks	64-bit iOS, ARM64 Linux
14 Dec 2021	8.0	LispWorks	Native support for Apple silicon Macs
03 Mar 2025	8.1	LispWorks	Support for Wayland and Gtk+ 3

== See also ==
- Allegro Common Lisp
